= Moorehead Phase =

Moorehead Phase may refer to:

- Moorehead Phase (Cahokia), an archaeological phase of the Cahokia and environs 1200-1275
- Moorehead Phase of the Laurentian Tradition or Moorehead burial tradition, of the Red Paint People, 3000-1000 BCE
