= Red Ocher people =

Indigenous people of North America

- Geographical range: Great Lakes: Ontario, SW Michigan, W Ohio, Northern Indiana, Illinois, Iowa, Ohio and Wisconsin.
- Period: Formative stage
- Dates: 1000 BCE to 400 BCE
- Type site: Morton Site, Fulton County, Illinois
- Major sites: Moccasin Bluff-A site, Berrien County, Michigan, Killarney Bay Mound, Manitoulin District, Oak Grove Site, Lake County, Indiana, Sny-Magill Mound 43, Clayton County, Iowa
- Preceded by: Hopewell tradition
- Followed by: Goodall focus
- Defined by: Layers of red ocher in burial mounds

The Red Ocher people were an indigenous people of North America. A series of archaeological sites located in the Upper Great Lakes, the Greater Illinois River Valley, and the Ohio River Valley in the American Midwest have been discovered to be a Red Ocher burial complex, dating from 1000 BC to 400 BC, the Terminal Archaic – Early Woodland period. Characterized as shallow burials located in sandy ridges along river valleys, covered in red ochre or hydrated iron oxide (FeH_{3}O), they contain diagnostic artifacts that include caches of flint points, turkey-tails, and various forms of worked copper. Turkey-tails are large flint blades of a distinct type. It is believed that Red Ocher people spoke an ancestral form of the Algonquian languages.

Red ochre has a long history of use in North America; as early as the Folsom tradition during the Paleo-Indian period, certain localities in New Mexico and Wyoming were being mined for the substance. The people today known as Red Ocher were first identified by the University of Chicago in 1937.

During the late 1950s and early 1960s, the Red Ocher Culture was a topic of great interest among archaeologists who were trying to better define the burial culture through various methods of research. Since then, intermittent archaeological works have been published dealing with specific sub-topics within the burial culture and supported by more reliable AMS carbon dates. Nevertheless, many important archaeological questions regarding the Red Ocher burial manifestation and cultural phenomenon are still without answers.

== Etymology ==
This culture used powdered red ocher in their burials. There is considerable variation from site to site in the few sites with this artifact. The term "Red Ocher" was first used in 1937 as a description from three sites in central Illinois. Some additional sites have since been recognized as Red Ocher because of their cultural similarity to these. There is not a broad synthesis of the existing information and it is easily confused with the Glacial Kame culture.

== Location ==
It is found in Wisconsin, Michigan, Illinois, Iowa, Indiana, and Ohio. The sites are from eastern Iowa to central Ohio and from southern Ohio to the Manitoulin District of Ontario. Most of the sites are in southeastern Wisconsin, northern Illinois, northern Indiana, and the southern half of the Lower Peninsula of Michigan. This area of Red Ocher culture is a co-occupant with Glacial Kame. It seems probable that the Old Copper merges into both Red Ocher and Glacial Kame.

== See also ==
- Red Paint People
- Maritime Archaic
