= Glacial kame =

Glacial kame may refer to:

- A kame deposited by a glacier
- The Glacial Kame culture
