= Goodall focus =

North American archaeological culture (200–500 BCE)

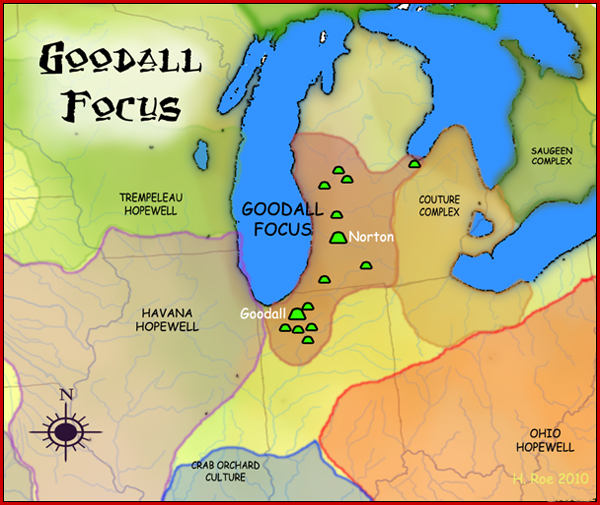
- The Goodall focus and some of its major sites
- Geographical range: Great Lakes: Ontario, Michigan, Ohio, and Indiana
- Period: Paleo-Indians
- Dates: 200 BCE to 500 CE
- Type site: Ridgeway Site in Hardin County, Ohio.
- Major sites: Zimmerman Site,
- Preceded by: Paleo-Indians
- Followed by: Point Peninsula complex, Saugeen complex, Goodall focus, and Norton Mound group
- Defined by: Burials in glacial kames

The Goodall focus was a Hopewellian culture from the Middle Woodland period peoples that occupied Western Michigan and northern Indiana from around 200 BCE to 500 CE. Extensive trade networks existed at this time, particularly among the many local cultural expressions of the Hopewell communities. The Goodall pattern stretched from the southern tip of Lake Michigan, east across northern Indiana, to the Ohio border, then northward, covering central Michigan, almost reaching to Saginaw Bay on the east and Grand Traverse Bay to the north. The culture is named for the Goodall site in northwest Indiana.

== Defining artifact ==
Glacial Kame is a widespread of the northern late archaic cultural manifestations. Cemeteries were customarily made in sand and gravel ridges formed by glacial outwash called "kames". Not all human burials in a kame are necessarily from the same time period, those which reflect similar methods and are associated with similar materials are related to some degree.

1. Glacial Kame cemeteries contain from only a few to several dozen burials. The tightly flexed human remains, usually singly but sometimes paired, were placed in circular pits barely large enough to permit placement of the body.
2. If a stratum of hard silt overlay the more easily removed sands and gravels, only the narrowest possible disturbance was created through the former.
3. Males and females representing all age groups were placed in these cemeteries.
4. Powdered ochre, contains iron oxides and ranges in color from bright yellow to a rich orange-red.
5. Large drilled sandal-sole-shaped and circular gorgets were cut from wall sections of marine molluscans.
6. A distinctive artifact is the so-called "birdstone." Commonly carved from slate, it has a profile resembling the head, body, and tail of a stylized bird.
7. A symbolic spear-thrower weight comparable to that of the bannerstone. There is no clear associations to confirm this idea.
8. Other artifacts include copper and shell beads, some made from the columella of marine shells, long bone pins, and bone awls.

== Ceramics ==
Ceramics tend to come from middens and contain expanding and contracting stemmed projectile points and obsidian flakes. Research has been on-going through the 1990s at sites in northwest Indiana, the Galien River Basin, the Kalamazoo River Basin and the Grand River basin.

== See also ==
- Hopewell tradition
- List of Hopewell sites
- Norton Mound group
