= McWhinney =

McWhinney is a surname. Notable people with the surname include:

- Madeline McWhinney Dale (1922–2020), American economist and banker
- Agnes McWhinney (1891–1987), Australian lawyer
- Alec Mawhinney (1894–1967), Australian rules footballer
- Glenn McWhinney (1930–2012), Canadian football player
- Ian McWhinney (1926–2012), English physician and academic
- Jeff McWhinney (born 1960), Irish deaf social entrepreneur and activist
- Peter McWhinney (born 1956), Australian golfer
- Ted McWhinney (1924–2015), Canadian lawyer, academic and politician

== See also ==
- McWhinney point
- Grady McWhiney (1928–2006), American historian
