= Glacial Kame culture =

Archaic culture in the Great Lakes region of North America

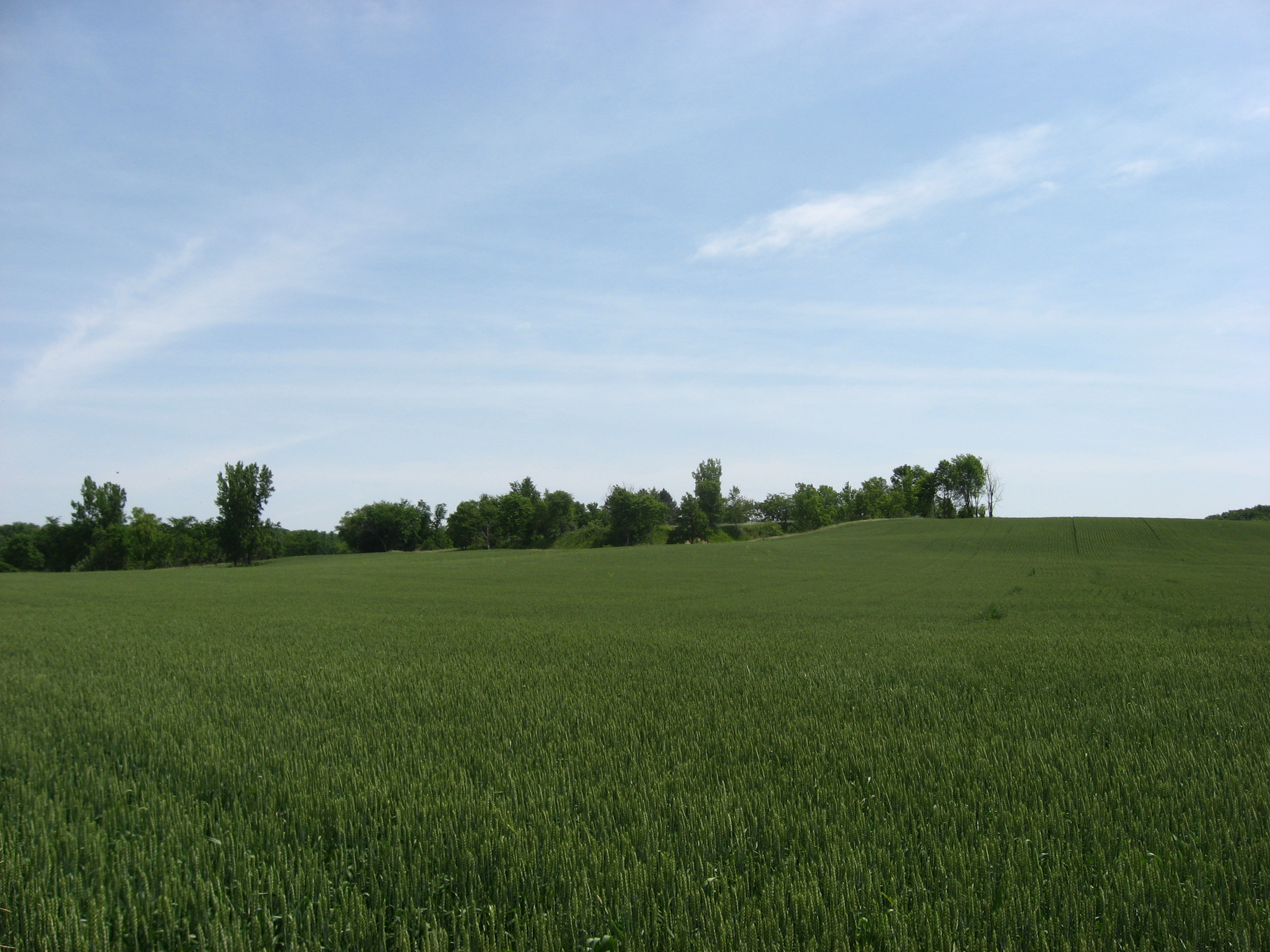
The Zimmerman Site, a leading Glacial Kame site

The Glacial Kame culture was a culture of Archaic people in North America that occupied southern Ontario, Michigan, Ohio, and Indiana from around 8000 BC to 1000 BC. The name of this culture derives from its members' practice of burying their dead atop glacier-deposited gravel hills. Among the most common types of artifacts found at Glacial Kame sites are shells of marine animals and goods manufactured from a copper ore, known as float copper.

== Sites and region ==
The type site for Glacial Kame is the Ridgeway Site near the village of Ridgeway in Hardin County, Ohio. The site was rediscovered in 1856 by workers building a railroad line nearby, who mined the kame for ballast; the supervisor's detailed report of the excavation has survived to the present-day and is a premier resource for the culture.

Archaeologists specializing in Ohio became familiar with Glacial Kame sooner than with the state's other cultures; even as late as the 1930s, Glacial Kame sites were the only widely known ones other than some later sites on the Lake Erie shoreline and a few large Hopewellian geometric earthworks in the southern part of the state.

Other regional cultures include the Maple Creek Culture of southwestern Ohio, Red Ocher Culture and Old Copper Culture of Wisconsin.

== Material culture ==
For a time, it was thought that the Glacial Kame culture did not produce ceramics, but this understanding was disproven by the discovery of basic pottery at the Zimmerman site near Roundhead, Ohio. Excavation of Glacial Kame sites frequently yields few projectile points. Some of the most important sites have yielded no projectile points at all — and their few points that have been found are of diverse styles. For this reason, it appears that different groups of Glacial Kame peoples independently developed different methods of manufacturing their projectile points. This diversity appears even in the culture's heartland in Champaign, Hardin, and Logan counties in western Ohio; one large Logan County site yielded just three points, each of which was significantly different from the other two.
