= McWhinney point =

Type of archaeological artifact found in the US

McWhinney or McWhinney Heavy Stemmed is a term for a shape of point in prehistoric lithic weapons and tools found primarily in the midwestern United States, dating from the Late Archaic period in the Americas. The points have been found in Indiana, Ohio, and Kentucky.

The McWhinney Heavy Stemmed type has become in some ways a representation of the ambiguous in the field of archaeology. The first to describe the McWhinney point type was J.M. Heilman, based on a surface collection from the McWhinney Village in Preble County, Ohio. Kent Vickery (1972:3) has suggested that McWhinney Heavy Stemmed points, “exhibit considerable stylistic variation, and probably represent several varieties.”

== Typology ==
McWhinney Heavy Stemmed points represent considerable stylistic variation and have been poorly defined and represented in the archaeological record (Vickery 1972). The McWhinney type description is vague at best and is in need of an accurate type definition. Currently, there are a few known points that are similar to McWhinney, these include: Karnak, Lamoka, and Bradley Spike (Justice 1987).
