= Red Paint People =

Pre-Columbian Native American culture

- Pre-Columbian culture
- Location: North America

The Red Paint People are a Pre-Columbian culture indigenous to the New England and Atlantic Canada regions of North America, probably a subset of the Maritime Archaic cultural complex.

== Description ==
They were named after their burials, which used large quantities of ochre, normally red, to cover both the bodies of the dead and grave goods. Sometimes they are known as the Moorehead Phase of the Laurentian Tradition or the Moorehead burial tradition after Warren K. Moorehead who brought them widely to the attention of scientists. They flourished between 3000 BCE and 1000 BCE. Alternatively, they can be called by the period in which they lived, either the "Maritime Archaic" (emphasizing a coastal and seafaring culture) or "Late Archaic" (emphasizing time and leaving open the possibility of living inland seasonally), although these terms often cover the longer period from 7000 BCE to 1000 CE. Multiple hypotheses exist as to which if any later peoples might be their descendants and there is little archaeological evidence to support any hypothesis.

Their burial culture was more elaborate than any subsequent culture in the area. In the southern portion of their range, they were succeeded by the Susquehana culture which used pottery, and no evidence of their stoneworking techniques is found in that culture.

== Lifestyle and technology ==
The Red Paint People lived, fished, and hunted along the coasts and rivers. Some coastal sites show evidence of year-round occupation, discrediting an older theory that these people were seasonal nomads, living the summers on the coast and the winters inland. Their diet included sea and migratory fish, shellfish, meat, berries, acorns, nuts, and roots. The Red Paint People had stone and bone tools, as well as boats capable of catching swordfish. No pottery or metal tools have been found in sites associated with this culture. Their trading range is known to have extended from Labrador to the New York side of Lake Champlain.

== Scientific investigation ==
The graves with red paint were known as early as the 1840s, but the first scientific examination was undertaken in 1892 by Charles Willoughby of the Peabody Museum of Archaeology and Ethnology at Harvard University. Willoughby exhibited a scale model of the dig at the World's Columbian Exposition in Chicago in 1893. It caught the attention of Moorehead, who carried out more excavations and published their site reports from 1912 to the 1920s. He described the people as older than other cultures of the area. This was disputed until radiometric dating proved Moorehead correct. In the 1930s, one theory for their disappearance was that the Red Paint People had been killed by tsunamis caused by coastal subsidence. This is no longer believed; while older archaeological sites have been lost due to sea level rise after the last glacial maximum, the tidal wave theory lacks credibility.

== See also ==
- Red Ocher people

== Sources ==
- Bourque, Bruce (2012). The Swordfish Hunters. Bunker Hill. ISBN 978-1-5937-3038-3.
- Rolde, Neil (1990). Maine: A narrative history. Harpswell Press. pp. 2–4. ISBN 0-88448-069-0.
- Aikens, C.M.; Ames, K.M. & Sanger, D. (1986). "Affluent collectors at the edges of Eurasia and North America: Some comparisons and observations on the evolution of society among north-temperate coastal hunter-gatherers". University of Tokyo Museum Bulletin. 27. Tokyo, JP: The University Museum, The University of Tokyo. Archived from the original on 2007-02-07.
- Robinson, Brian (10 January 2004). "The Red Paint People". seacoastnh.com. Archived from the original on 14 January 2010.
- Alward, Brian & Atherton, Morgan (c. 2001). "Time range". The Red Paint People. usm.maine.edu. Gorham, ME: University of Southern Maine. Archived from the original on 9 September 2006.
- Alward, Brian & Atherton, Morgan (c. 2001). "Turner farm". The Red Paint People. usm.maine.edu. Gorham, ME: University of Southern Maine. Archived from the original on 9 September 2006.
