= Maple Creek phase =

The Maple Creek phase is an archaeological phase, remains of which have been found on the Ohio and Kentucky sides of the Ohio River, primarily around the area of modern Cincinnati. The material culture of the Maple Creek phase is characterized by McWhinney Heavy Stemmed points, Meron-Trimble points, a chipped-stone micro-tool industry, diagnostic features such as earth ovens, and large riverine base camps. This suite of cultural characteristics appear to be shared by a number of sites in this area in the period of approximately 5000-3000 B.P., ending with the Early Woodland period.

Maple Creek phase sites within the Ohio River Valley proper include the Maple Creek site, at the confluence of Maple Creek and the Ohio River in Clermont County, and Mexico Bottoms, in the Ohio River Bottoms of Indiana. Both are described by Kent Vickery as regional base camps with summer and fall occupations.

Sites have also been found further east than Cincinnati, along the Ohio River. The Mabel Hall site, on the Ohio River floodplain, in Lawrence County, Ohio, is another example of a site that bears affinities to the Maple Creek phase, although it is considerably east of the area that is generally identified with the phase. It has a Late Archaic-Early Woodland period occupation with a minor Late Woodland component. Late Archaic stemmed points, some of which are similar to McWhinney Heavy Stemmed points, are present at this site, as well as Early Woodland Fayette Thick ceramics. The Davisson Farm site in Lawrence County has a Maple Creek component and a Late Archaic component that Purtill describes as Laurentian Archaic.

Fewer cultural diagnostics are attributable to upland populations far from the major river valleys. However, upland Maple Creek culture sites are known at the Houpt site, Glacken site, and the Oberschlake #1 site.
