= Zimmerman Kame =

Archaeological site in Ohio, United States

- U.S. National Register of Historic Places
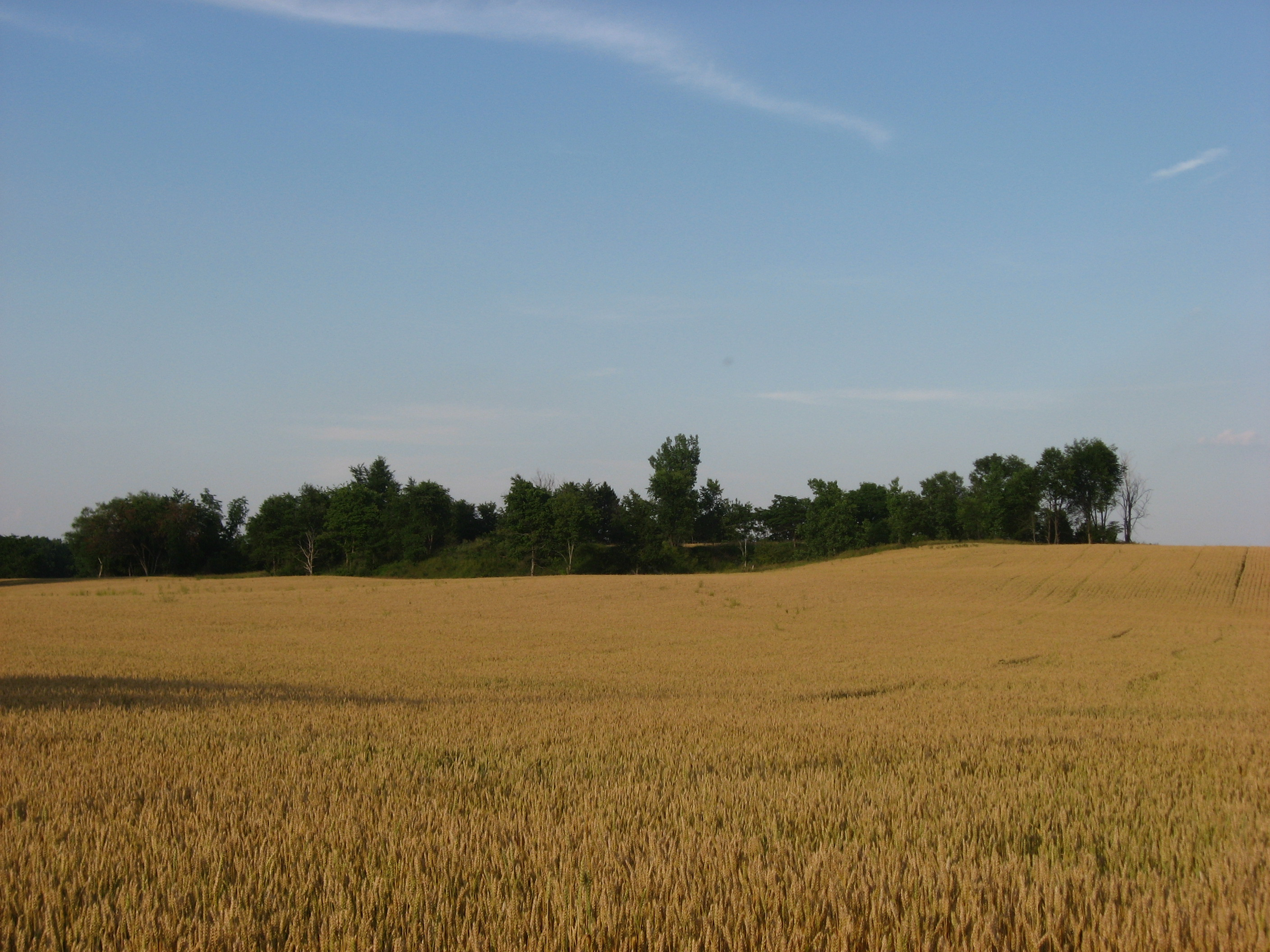
- Western side of the kame

- Location within Ohio Location within the United States
- Location: Off Township Road 39, Roundhead, Ohio, United States
- Coordinates: 40°34′24.636″N 83°49′9.588″W
- Area: 5 acres (2.0 ha)
- NRHP reference No.: 74001523
- Added to NRHP: July 30, 1974

The Zimmerman Kame (also called the "Zimmerman Site"; designated 33HR2) is a glacial kame and archaeological site in McDonald Township, Hardin County, Ohio, United States, near the community of Roundhead. A circular hill approximately 20 feet (6.1 m) in height, it was a commercial gravel pit for a time before being abandoned in the 1970s after artifacts of the ancient Glacial Kame culture of Native Americans were found at the site. Today, the kame is tree-covered and surrounded by farm fields; there are no obvious signs of its significance.

The Zimmerman Kame is one of many archaeological sites in Hardin County. A survey conducted in the early twentieth century revealed at least five different archaeological sites in McDonald Township and the adjacent Roundhead Township and a total of forty-four sites across the county. Many burial sites were located on top of hills such as the Zimmerman Kame. Among the most significant artifacts found at the Zimmerman Site were small objects of pottery; previous to the Zimmerman discovery, the Glacial Kame people were not known to have produced ceramics.

In 1974 the site was listed on the National Register of Historic Places because of its potential to yield more information about the Glacial Kame culture. It was the first such kame to be listed on the Register.

== See also ==
- Ridgeway Site
