= Ridgeway Site =

Archaeological site in Ohio, U.S.

- Periods: Late Archaic
- Cultures: Glacial Kame culture
- Location: Hardin County, Ohio, USA
- Region: Hardin County, Ohio

History
- Event(s): Burial site, archaeological site

The Ridgeway Site (also known as the "Ridgeway Kame" or the "Richardson Kame") is a former archaeological site and burial site in the west-central part of the U.S. state of Ohio. Revealed to be a leading site by the construction of a railroad, it yielded a large and highly informational number of artifacts and buried bodies. It is the type site of the Glacial Kame culture: all other sites of the same culture are measured against it.

== Background ==
Located between the villages of Ridgeway and Mount Victory in southeastern Hardin County's Hale Township, it consisted of a large kame of gravel that had been deposited by glaciers. In the first years of the white settlement of Ohio, the kame was not widely known to be an archaeological site; locals found artifacts and skeletons there, but news of its existence first reached a wider audience in 1856. In that year, the Bellefontaine and Indiana Railroad began constructing a rail line between Mount Victory and Ridgeway. Because the railroad needed significant amounts of gravel for track ballast purposes, a small spur line was built from the main line to the base of the hill, enabling workers to shovel gravel into rail cars that were then taken to the construction zone. Before their excavations, it appeared to be a simple hill, about 1.5 acres (0.61 ha) in area and covered with an apple orchard; before the apple trees were planted, it had been the site of an unusually dense and lush woodland.

== Findings ==
As digging at the Richardson Kame continued, workers began to find significant numbers of skeletons; by the time the quarrying process was complete, hundreds of buried bodies had been discovered. The exact number of burials is uncertain; one source records 380 bodies, while lead excavator John Matson recorded 308, and he estimated that the remains of as many as four or five hundred individuals had been interred at the site. These bodies were buried in a range of positions and conditions; some bodies were face-down and others were flexed in other ways, and evidence of cremation was also present. More than fifty of the skeletons were shown to have been the bodies of children under the age of eight years, including one unborn child inside the ribs of its mother. Conversely, at least seven bodies showed pronounced ossification in the cartilage of their tracheas; Matson believed this to be a sign of extreme age, and recent research shows that this process is often correlated with advancing age. Not all of the bones were present as complete skeletons; some bodies had plainly been beheaded, and one of the burial pits yielded a pile of twenty-seven skulls. Moreover, the bodies did not appear to have been buried soon after death; the positions in which the bones were found convinced Matson that they had been buried after the flesh was no longer present. Besides human bodies, findings in the kame included the bodies of dogs next to human skeletons, plus beads of copper and shells, other copper tools, various stone tools, and sandal-sole-shaped shell gorgets. The most important of these artifacts included a bird stone, awls made from the bones of deer, a string of shell beads 90 feet (27 m) long that had been wrapped multiple times around a group of bodies, and groups of rattlesnake rattles that were not included in Matson's report.

== Results ==
Throughout the excavation, Matson was careful to record the findings at the site, and he published his conclusions after the excavation was concluded. Because little was known in the mid-19th century about Ohio's prehistoric inhabitants, he was unable to identify the cultural affinity of the people buried at the Ridgeway Site: they were plainly not part of any people that had previously been recorded. As a result, his conclusions were limited to the observation that the Ridgeway people were able to trade with people who lived around sources of shells and copper. In the 1880s, the site was seen as an extreme example of a site of the Mound Builders, but since that time, the Ridgeway Site has been identified as the type site of the Glacial Kame culture, which was prominent throughout the Great Lakes region during the later portion of the Archaic period. Today, Hardin County and the adjacent Logan County are regarded as the heartland of the Glacial Kame people, and the Ridgeway and Zimmerman sites in southern Hardin County are among the most significant sites ever found of that people. Many known Glacial Kame sites are of relatively little archaeological value, as they are frequently discovered only after modern excavation machinery has destroyed many of the ancient artifacts; as a result, well-recorded sites like Ridgeway and Zimmerman are of immense value.
