= Lime Kiln =

Lime Kiln, or variants, may refer to:

- Lime kiln, a kiln to produce quicklime
- Limekiln, Pennsylvania, an unincorporated community in the U.S.
- Limekiln Lake, Inlet, New York, U.S.
- Limekilns, a village in Fife, Scotland
- Limekilns, New South Wales, a rural locality in Australia
- Lime Kiln Halt railway station, Isle of Man
- Lime Kiln Mountain, in the Ozarks of Missouri, U.S.
- Lime Kilns (Eureka, Utah), an historic site in Utah, U.S.
- Lime Kilns (Lincoln, Rhode Island), an historic site in Rhode Island, U.S.

== See also ==
- List of lime kilns
  - List of lime kilns in the United States
- Lime Kiln Creek, a stream in California, United States
- Lime Kiln Light, a light house in Washington, United States
- Lime Kiln Middle School, in Howard County, Maryland, United States
- Lime Kiln Point State Park, Washington, United States
- Lime Kiln Road, Dutchess County, New York, United States
- Limekiln State Park, California, United States
- Lime Kiln Valley AVA, a wine growing region of California
- Lime Kiln Field Day, a 1913 silent film rediscovered in 2014
