= List of lime kilns =

Historic or notable lime kilns include.

== Australia ==
- Lime Kiln Remains, Ipswich
- Pipers Creek Lime Kilns
- Raffan's Mill and Brick Bottle Kilns
- There were a number of lime kilns at Wool Bay, South Australia. One kiln remains and was listed along with the jetty under the name of Wool Bay Lime Kiln & Jetty on the South Australian Heritage Register on 28 November 1985.

There also are or were lime kilns at:

- Adbri
- Anna Creek Station
- Blayney, New South Wales
- Bower, South Australia
- Claremont, Ipswich
- Coopers Creek, Victoria
- Galong, New South Wales
- Kingston and Arthur's Vale Historic Area
- Langshaw Marble Lime Works
- Marmor, Queensland
- New Farm, Queensland
- North Coogee, Western Australia
- Platina railway station
- Point Nepean
- Portland Cement Works Precinct
- Portland, New South Wales
- Quarry Amphitheatre
- Quartz Roasting Pits Complex
- South Fremantle, Western Australia
- Walkerville, Victoria
- Waurn Ponds, Victoria

== United Kingdom ==
- Annery kiln, Monkleigh, England
- Limekilns at Kiln Park, Pembrokeshire, Penally, Wales
- Cocking Lime Works, West Sussex, England
- Grove Lime Kiln, Isle of Portland, England
- Minera Limeworks, Wrexham, Wales
- Solva limekilns, Pembrokeshire, Wales

There are or were lime kilns at many other places in the United Kingdom.

== See also ==
- Lime Kiln (disambiguation)
- Category:Lime kilns in Canada
- Category:Lime kilns in France
- Category:Lime kilns in Germany
- Category:Lime kilns in Hong Kong
- Category:Lime kilns in Hungary
- Category:Lime kilns in Ireland
- Category:Lime kilns in Italy
- Category:Lime kilns in Latvia
- Category:Lime kilns in Portugal
- Category:Lime kilns in Slovenia
- Category:Lime kilns in South Africa
- Category:Lime kilns in Sweden
