= Claremont, Ipswich =

Claremont
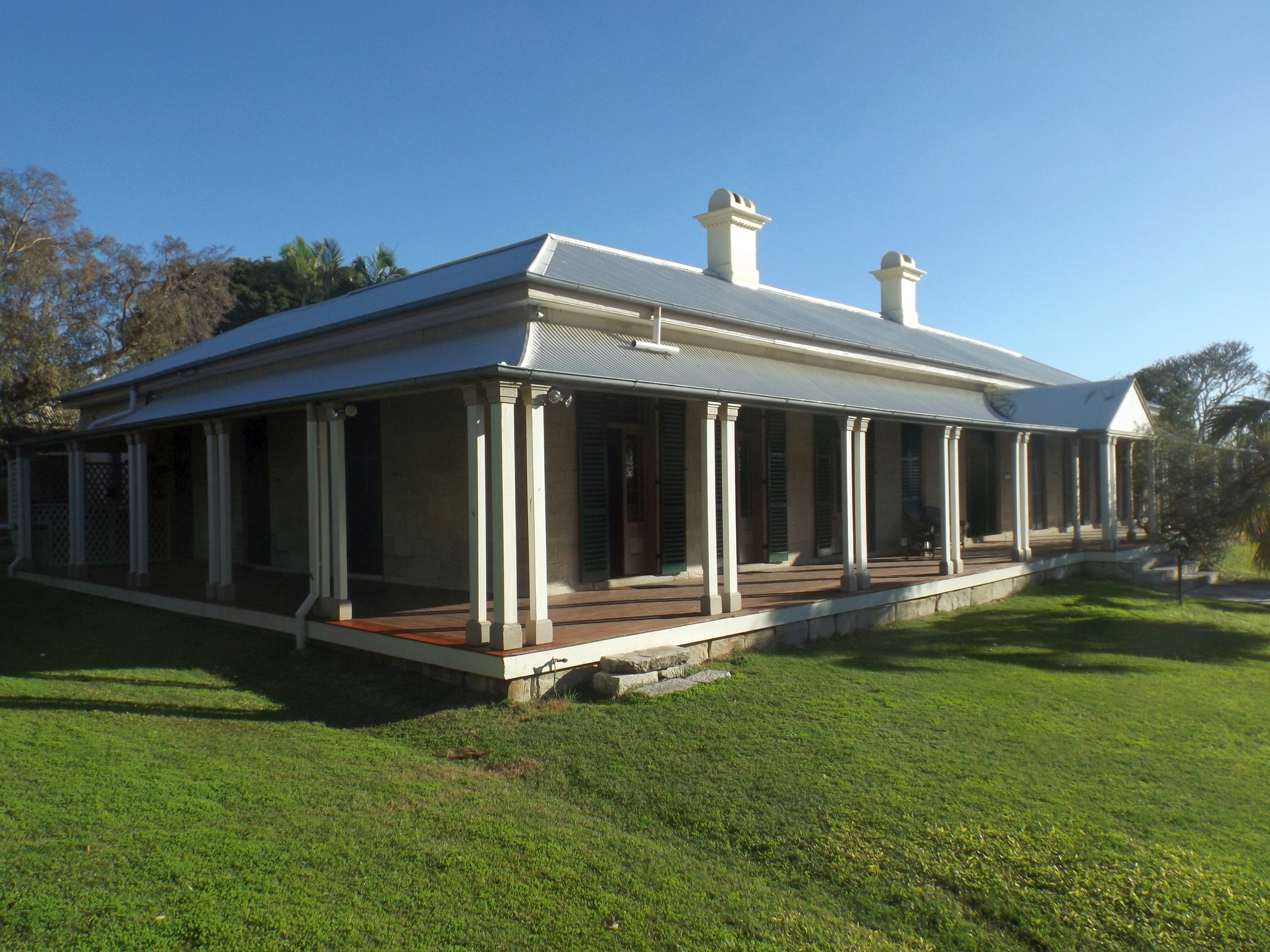
- Residence in 2016

- Location within Queensland Location within Australia
- 27.6137°S 152.7661°E
- Location: 1A Milford Street, Ipswich, City of Ipswich, Queensland, Australia

History
- Design period: 1840s–1860s (mid-19th century)
- Built: 1857
- Built for: John Panton

Site notes
- Architect: William Claydon Wakefield
- Architectural style: Georgian

Queensland Heritage Register
- Official name: Claremont
- Type: state heritage (built, archaeological, landscape)
- Designated: 21 October 1992
- Reference no.: 600589
- Significant period: 1850s–1860s (fabric); 1820s–1830s, 1850s–1900s (historical); 1820s–1830s (potential)
- Significant components: views from, steps/stairway, residential accommodation – main house, garden/grounds, trees/plantings, paving, cellar, views to

Claremont is a heritage-listed villa at 1A Milford Street, Ipswich, City of Ipswich, Queensland, Australia. It was designed by William Claydon Wakefield and was built in 1857. It was added to the Queensland Heritage Register on 21 October 1992.

== History ==
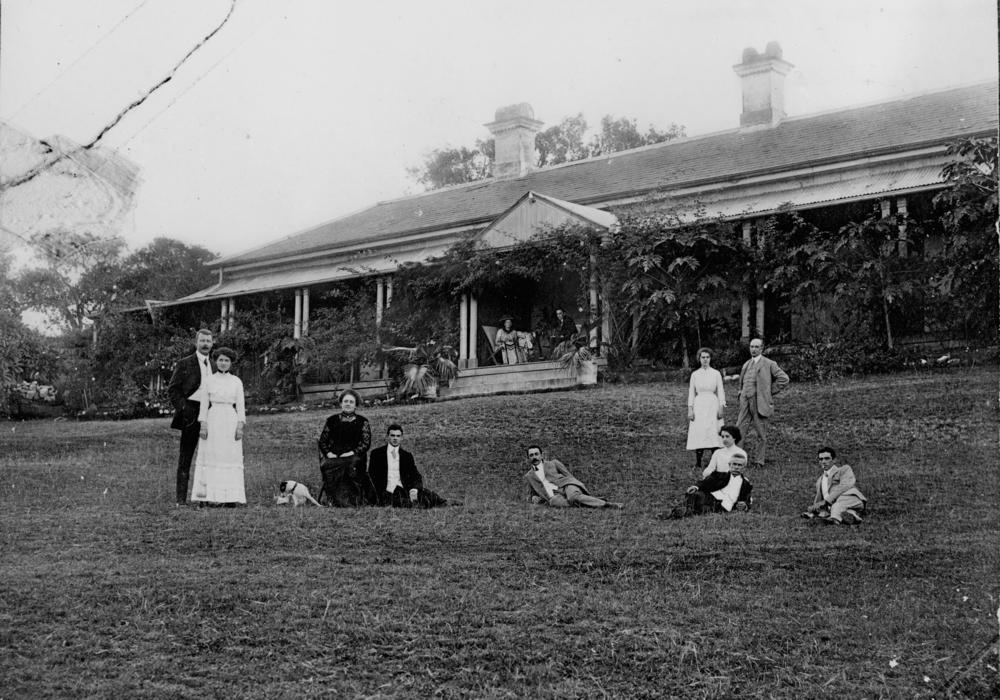
Wilson family members on the lawn at Claremont, 1912

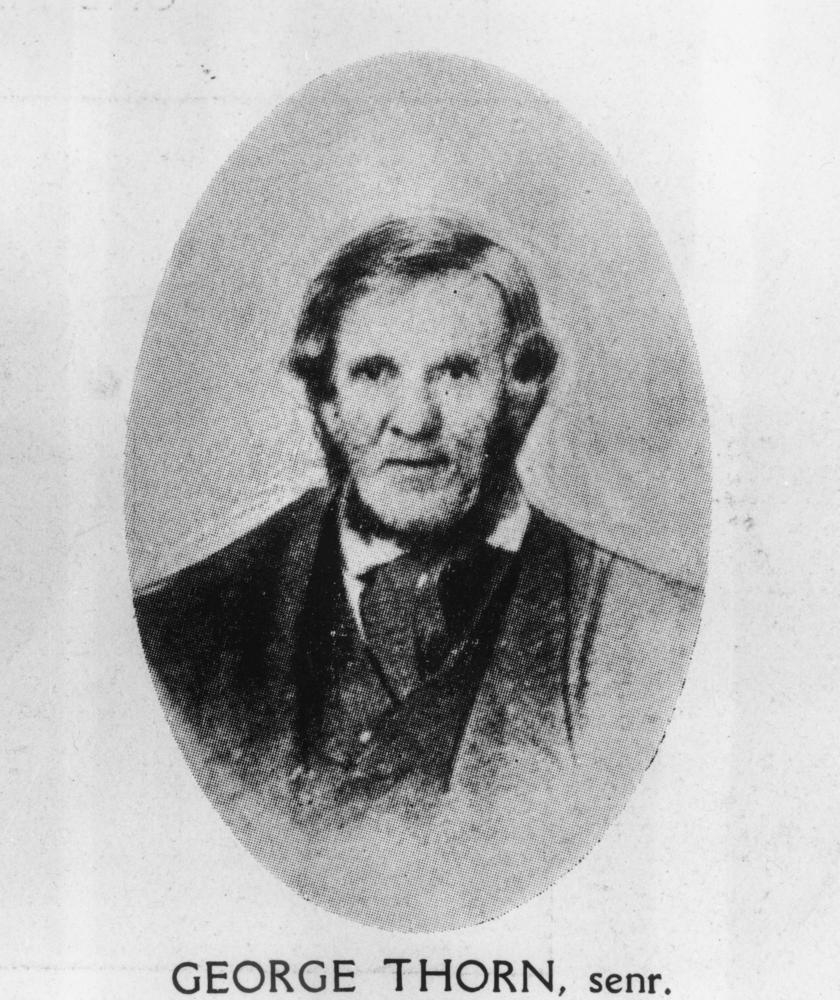
George Thorn, senior

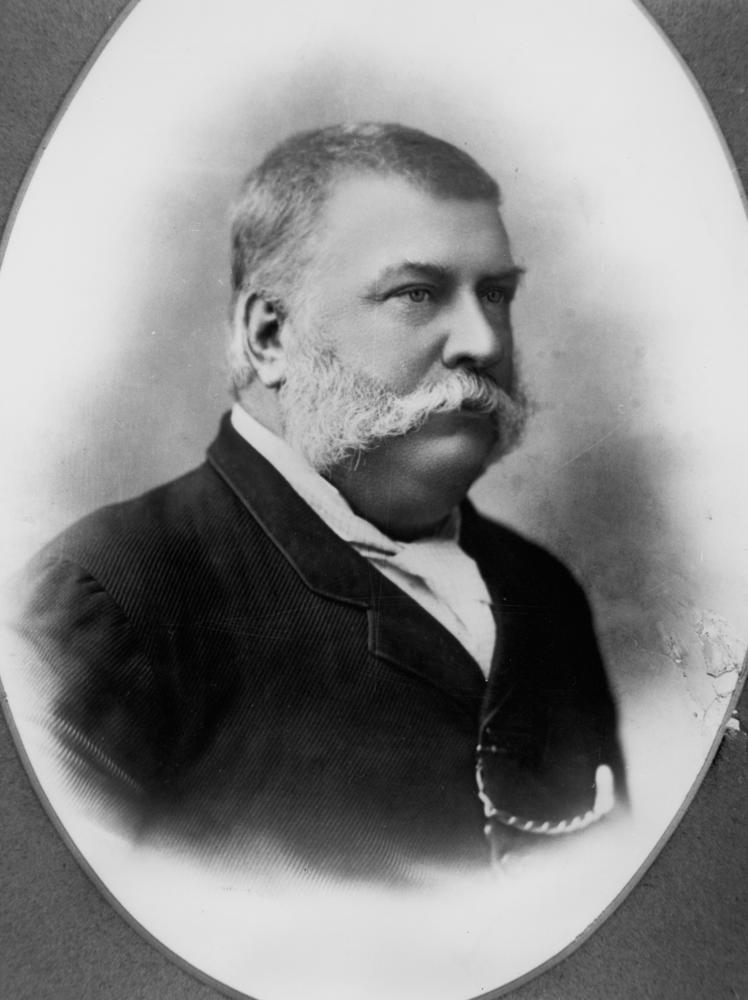
George Thorn, junior

Claremont is a Georgian style stone villa overlooking the Bremer River. It was designed in 1857 by William Claydon Wakefield for John Panton and was built on the earliest site to be occupied by Europeans in Ipswich. John Panton was a Member of both the New South Wales and Queensland Legislative Councils and a prominent Ipswich merchant. However financial difficulties forced the sale of the house in 1862. (In 1865 the Pantons built another house at 5 Blackall Street, East Ipswich which they also called Claremont, but that second Claremont is not the subject of this article).

In 1862 the first Claremont was purchased by George Thorn (senior), originally superintendent of convicts at Ipswich, who became a politician, as did four of his sons. George Thorn Jnr. served as Premier of Queensland while living at Claremont and the house was for many years an important social and political centre in Ipswich.

In 1827, the Commandant of the Moreton Bay Penal colony sent a group of convicts up the Bremer River to quarry and process limestone for building purposes. Huts and a lime kiln were set up, followed by enclosures for animals. The site covered what are now the grounds of Claremont and their immediate vicinity and was named Limestone Station. In 1838 George Thorn was appointed Superintendent of Convicts at Limestone and lived with his family in a cottage to the north west of where Claremont now stands. He stayed on after the penal colony was closed and became a wealthy merchant and pastoralist. Physical evidence for this first European use of the site may survive below ground. The remains of the kiln were visible until the 1960s and their location, close to the current house, is marked; the remains are listed on the Queensland Heritage Register.

In 1842, when Moreton Bay was opened for free settlement, the first survey of Limestone was made and this land was divided into blocks and sold. By 1852 it was held by several owners, but all the northern parts of section XXXVI were later acquired by John Panton, the son of the New South Wales Post-Master General, who had moved to Limestone in 1851 and had established himself successfully as a merchant. In 1855, he built a two-story warehouse to the northwest of the present house. The site is at the head of navigation of the river and is just upstream of the Pool, an area which permitted steam boats to turn and which was then close to the wharves. His acquisition of this site and location of the warehouse emphasise the importance of the river to Ipswich as a trading centre before the coming of the railway.

In 1857 Panton added a villa designed by William Claydon Wakeling to the site and named it Claremont. Only a few years after this, in the early 1860s, Panton experienced financial difficulties and sold Claremont to George Thorn, who was by then a leading figure in Ipswich. The Thorns were closely involved in politics, George and four of his sons serving as Members of the Legislative Assembly at various times. The eldest son, George Thorn, junior, was Premier between 1876 and 1877 while he was living at Claremont.

In 1874, a section of land running between Claremont and the river bank was resumed as part of the construction of the Brisbane to Ipswich Railway. This reduced the grounds to an area of 2 acres (0.81 ha) and 23 perches (580 m^{2}) and Panton's warehouse may have been demolished at this point. The property remained in the Thorn family until 1906 when it was purchased by George Rennie Wilson. In 1919 the land was again subdivided and some sold, reducing the Claremont block to 1 acre (0.40 ha), 21 perches (530 m^{2}).

Alterations occurred to the house in the 1920s with the rebuilding of the verandahs to a bungalow style. It was used as a boarding house between 1924 and 1939, when it was sold to Jessie Violet Preddy. The Preddys lived in the house only briefly before it was divided into three flats and the land further subdivided. During the 1940s the house became run down and the ends of both wings were demolished.

In 1964 the property was purchased by the Queensland Sub-Normal Children's Welfare Association and at this time some alterations were made to allow the house to be used as a hostel. These probably included converting the original double hipped slate roof into a single hip roof over the main rooms, installing bathrooms over the cellar and bricking in fireplaces. Landscaping was also done at this time, including the re-use of stone blocks from either the kiln or demolished sections, in order to form garden terraces.

In 1975 the National Trust of Queensland obtained a National Estate Grant to purchase Claremont, which was then sub-leased back to the Q.S-N.C.W.A. for three years. After remaining vacant for two years, the house was leased in 1980 to Architect Bruce Buchanan and restoration work began. In the following year the first open day for the general public was held. The Buchanan's moved out of the house in the mid eighties and the house has not been used since as a residence.

Considerable work has been done to Claremont since it was purchased by the Trust including the reconstruction of the verandah to its original form.

== Description ==
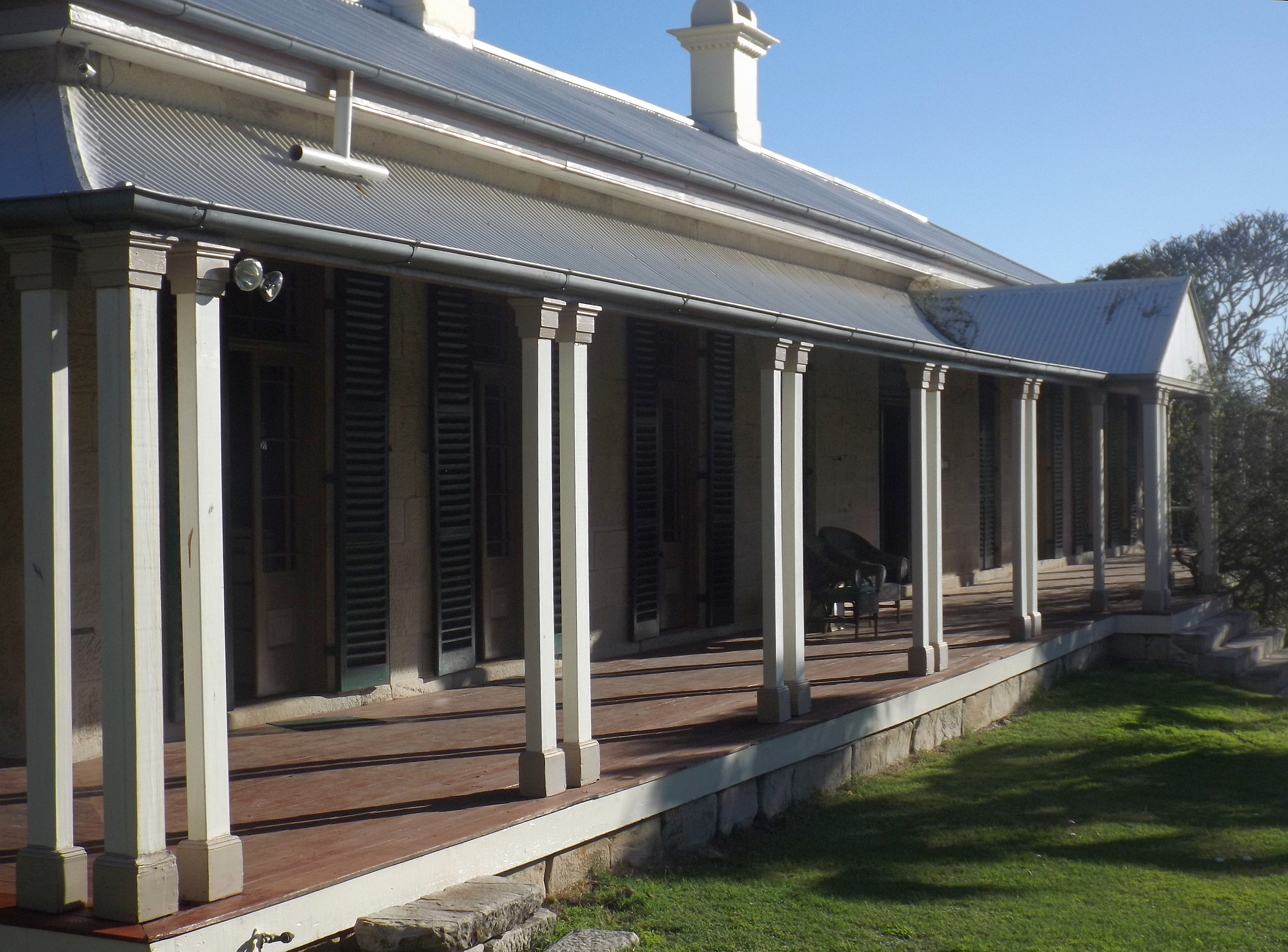
North facing verandah

Claremont is a single storey, Georgian style house with verandahs which addresses the Bremer River on the north. It is built to a U-shaped plan with wings of differing lengths. The style is reminiscent of earlier houses in Sydney and Tasmania and is rare in Queensland, although Claremont has some resemblance to Oakwal in Brisbane and to Ormiston House at Wellington Point, which were built a few years later.

The house is symmetrically arranged with French doors opening onto the verandah, which extends around the sides of the house. There is a stone paved verandah at the rear. The verandah roof has been reconstructed to its original form of a concave profile roof supported by simple posts on plain plinths.

It is constructed of a local sandstone, possibly from Woogaroo Quarry with brick walls internally. The form of construction is rare, incorporating timber tie beams at lintel level through the stone work. The framing for the original double hipped roof including the box gutter and some battening for slates, remains under the current roof which is single hipped and is clad with corrugated iron.

Decorative detail to the interior, such as the classical motifs on the cornices of the drawing and dining rooms, is simple and classically inspired in accordance with the Georgian style. There are nine chimneys and some original marble fireplaces and grates survive as does some door and window joinery.

There is a brick lined, stone flagged storage cellar beneath the former bathroom on the western side of the house. The original half spiral access stair survives, but much of the floor framing in this room is reconstructed. The kitchen also retains a stone flagged floor.

The gardens retain some elements of the original planting and a number of fine or unusual specimens including Ulmus parvifolia, golden bamboo, early varieties of hibiscus and an early, locally propagated variety of bouganvillea.

The view to the Bremer River survives.

== Heritage listing ==
Claremont was listed on the Queensland Heritage Register on 21 October 1992 having satisfied the following criteria.

The place is important in demonstrating the evolution or pattern of Queensland's history.

Claremont and its grounds demonstrate the evolution of Ipswich from a convict outpost for burning limestone, to an important early mercantile centre and a major city of Queensland.

The place demonstrates rare, uncommon or endangered aspects of Queensland's cultural heritage.

The house is a rare example of an early Georgian villa in Queensland and incorporates early and unusual building techniques.

The place has potential to yield information that will contribute to an understanding of Queensland's history.

The house and its grounds have the potential to yield, through the existing buildings and from archaeological evidence, information on the early use of the site and on the lifestyle of early owners.

The place is important because of its aesthetic significance.

It is also important for its aesthetic value as a work of architecture that is well liked by the community for style, material and detail.

The place has a special association with the life or work of a particular person, group or organisation of importance in Queensland's history.

Claremont has a strong association with John Panton and with the Thorn family, who were connected with the site from the earliest European occupation and who contributed to the development of Ipswich and of Queensland.
