= Lime Kiln Point State Park =

State park in Washington (state), U.S.

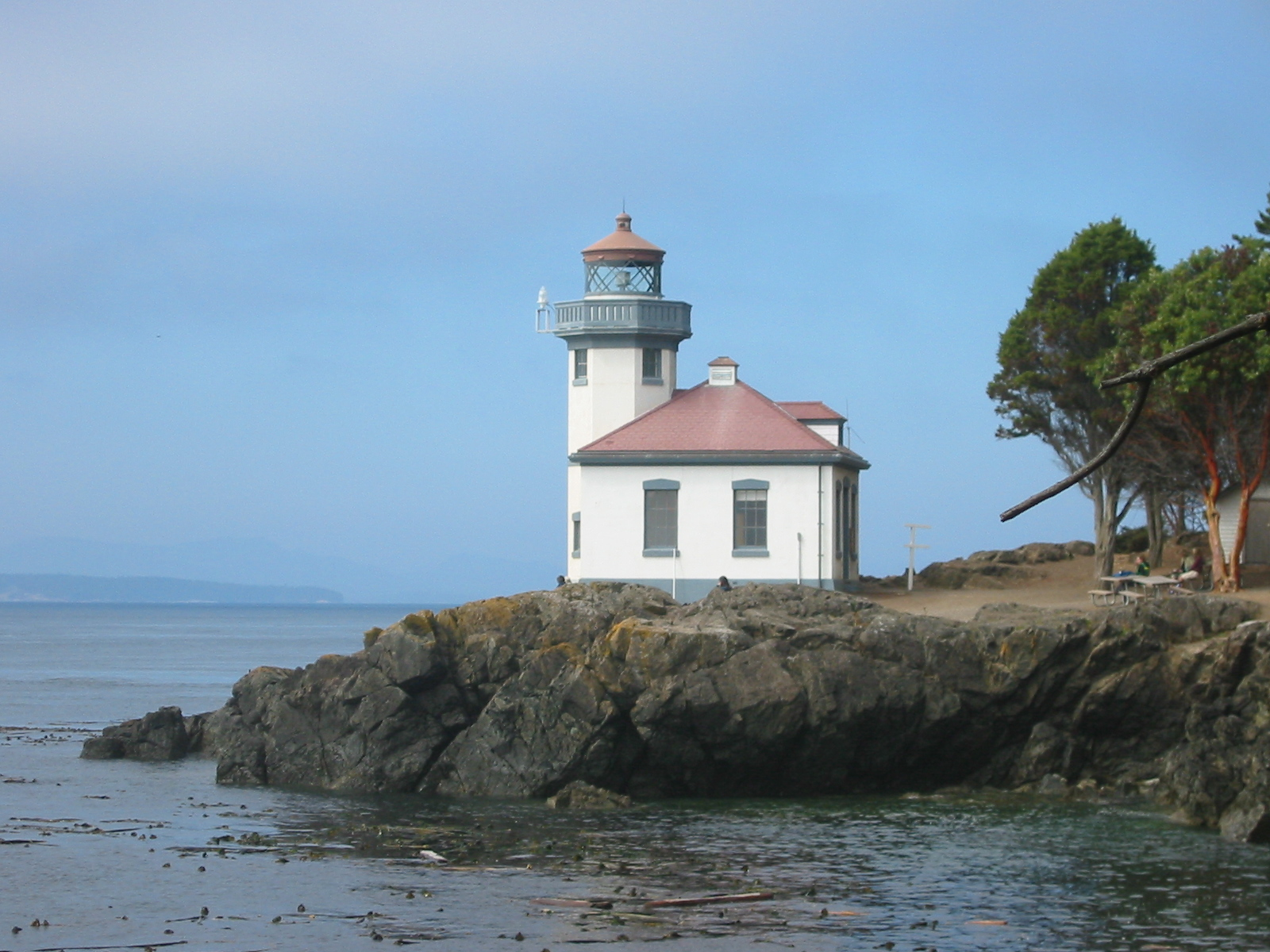
- Lime Kiln Lighthouse

- Location within Washington (state) Location within the United States
- Location: San Juan County, Washington, United States
- Coordinates: 48°30′57″N 123°09′09″W
- Area: 42 acres (17 ha)
- Elevation: 20 ft (6.1 m)
- Established: 1964
- Administrator: Washington State Parks and Recreation Commission
- Visitors: 242,996 (in 2024)
- Website: Official website

Lime Kiln Point State Park is a 42-acre Washington state park on the western shore of San Juan Island in the San Juan archipelago. The park is considered one of the best places in the world to view wild orcas from a land-based facility. Due to the unique bathymetric properties of the site, visitors on the shore can be within 20 feet of whales jumping out of the water (breaching and spyhopping). It houses one of Friday Harbor's two lighthouses along with a stone lookout with picnic tables. The park was the site of lime kilns beginning in 1860, and one kiln has been restored as a public exhibit.

== Activities and amenities ==
The park provides opportunities for picnicking, hiking, beachcombing, orca watching, and tours of the still operational Lime Kiln Light. An interpretive center has displays and activities about orcas and the area's former lime kiln industry. The park is supported in part by the Friends of Lime Kiln. Volunteers and marine naturalists are often onsite to assist and educate visitors.
