= Lime Kiln Remains, Ipswich =

Heritage-listed lime kiln at Ipswich, Queensland, Australia

Lime Kiln Remains
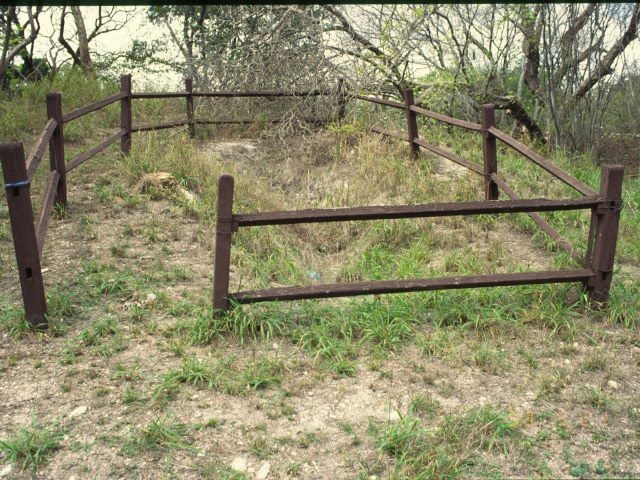
- Lime Kiln Remains, 1993

- Location within Queensland Location within Australia
- 27.6141°S 152.7699°E
- Location: 82 Chermside Road, Ipswich, City of Ipswich, Queensland, Australia

History
- Design period: 1840s–1860s (mid-19th century)
- Built: c. 1864

Queensland Heritage Register
- Official name: Lime Kiln Remains
- Type: state heritage (archaeological)
- Designated: 21 October 1992
- Reference no.: 600562
- Significant period: c. 1864 (fabric)
- Significant components: kiln
- Builders: William Hancock

Lime Kiln Remains is a heritage-listed lime kiln at 82 Chermside Road, Ipswich, City of Ipswich, Queensland, Australia. It was built c. 1864 by William Hancock. It was added to the Queensland Heritage Register on 21 October 1992.

== History ==
The Lime Kiln Remains are thought to have been built by William Hancock (a local builder) in the 1860s. This lime kiln was not the first to be established in Ipswich; however the remains of this kiln are significant as a link to the original settlement of Ipswich, formerly known as "Limestone".

Prior to the settlement at Ipswich, lime for building purposes in Brisbane had been obtained by burning sea-shells. It was in 1827 that Captain Patrick Logan discovered limestone deposits on the banks of the Bremer River:

In the general course of last year Captain Logan, in tracing the Bremer (of the late Mr. Oxley, who merely passed its mouth in 1824) from its junction with the Brisbane, discovered at ten miles through its many windings from that point, the calcareous hummocks on its right bank, now named the "Limestone Hills". ... Some months after this discovery a kiln was built, and a party of convicts, consisting of an overseer (acquainted with the operations of sapping and mining), and five men (convicts) were stationed at these hills to commence lime-burning.

The kiln operated on what was called Limestone Station until 1839 when the penal settlement was closed. It was reported to have produced 300–400 baskets of quick lime per week which were sent to Brisbane via the Bremer and Brisbane Rivers. The town of Limestone, now Ipswich, was established in 1842 on the site of Limestone Station.

Other kilns were constructed subsequent to the original convict construction, the remains of the existing kiln being one of them. Advertisements regarding the setting up of lime kilns at this location, and for the supply of lime by W Hancock, appeared in the Queensland Times from 1864. Hancock's Kiln was later reported as having been "erected on the most approved English methods.

William Hancock migrated from England in 1856 and worked for a short time in Brisbane prior to moving to Ipswich where he lived until his death on 23 August 1892. Hancock was born at St Ives, Cornwall, went to live in Yorkshire, and was married at Leeds in 1844. Hancock was well known in Ipswich as a "builder in brick" and building contractor and was involved in the construction of a number of buildings including, additions to Rockton Villa, Colinton Station, Booval House, the foundations of the first railway workshop, the Lands Office and the Wesleyan Parsonage as well as laying pipes for the waterworks in 1877. He also owned a soap and candle works at Churchill. It is quite likely that Hancock would have used lime from this kiln for his own building purposes as well as for sale.

The lime is believed to have come from the hummock of lime residue nearby as early photographs of the hummock show a much greater height than at present and also evidence of terracing such as would occur with mining.

The site was included in land granted to the Ipswich Girls' Grammar School in 1890.

The kiln remains were buried by road widening activities for Brisbane Street but were recovered in 1961 by excavations undertaken by the Limestone District Scout Group. The site has been subsequently infilled.

== Description ==
There are signs of a stone kiln 6 by 5 feet (1.8 by 1.5 m) into the steep bank below Brisbane Street. The kiln is in the form of an inverted cone with the lower part of the interior sloping inwards. The stone blocks are of silicified limestone of irregular size. Brickwork was mentioned in a newspaper report of the Scouts' excavation but is not exposed although brick fragments have been observed towards the outer side of the structure. A second kiln could exist alongside the excavated kiln as evidenced by the unusual depression into the bank roughly parallel to the excavated kiln.

The kiln lies at the base of the eastern of two north-northwest / south-southeast spine ridges of Tertiary silicified magnesian limestone. The hollow near the hummock believed to be the source of limestone quarrying in the 19th century.

== Heritage listing ==
Lime Kiln Remains was listed on the Queensland Heritage Register on 21 October 1992 having satisfied the following criteria.

The place is important in demonstrating the evolution or pattern of Queensland's history.

The Lime Kiln remains are a legacy of the early settlement of the Moreton Bay District. The lime-burning industry was the first established in the Ipswich area and the discovery of lime was the reason for the original settlement. The remains of the Lime Kiln are a link to the initial settlement of Ipswich.

The place demonstrates rare, uncommon or endangered aspects of Queensland's cultural heritage.

The Lime Kiln remains are a rare example of 19th century lime-burning technology. They are the only surviving example in the district.

The place has a special association with the life or work of a particular person, group or organisation of importance in Queensland's history.

The Lime Kiln Remains have special association with prominent local builder William Hancock who was a well known building contractor and "builder in brick" contributing significantly to the built environment of nineteenth century Ipswich.
