= Golden bamboo =

Golden bamboo may refer to one of at least two species in the subfamily Bambusoideae of the grass family, Poaceae:

- Bambusa vulgaris
- Phyllostachys aurea
