= Lime Kiln Light =

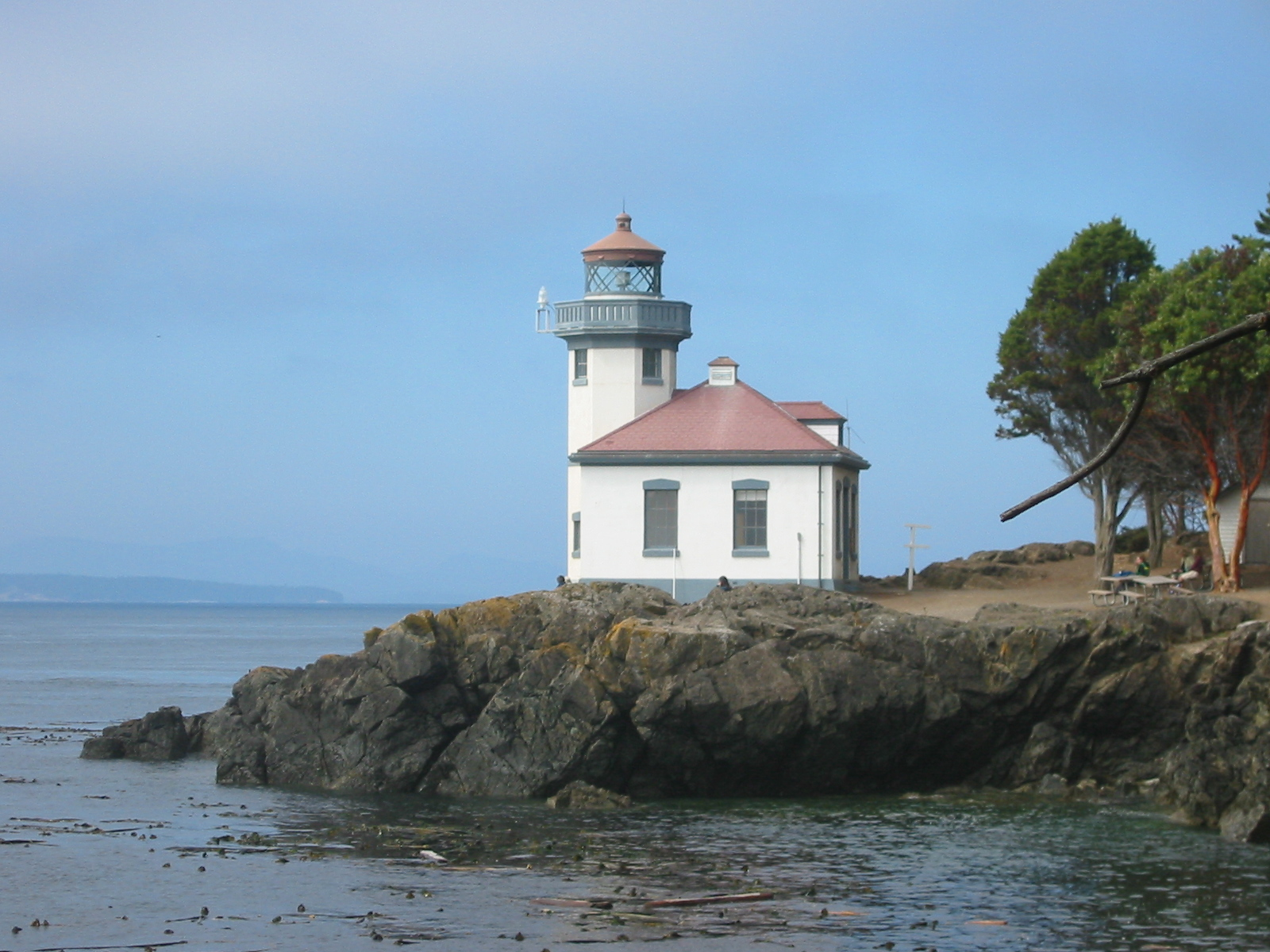
- Location: San Juan Island, Washington
- Coordinates: 48.5157°N 123.1527°W

Tower
- Constructed: 1914
- Foundation: Surface
- Construction: Concrete
- Automated: 1962
- Height: 38 feet (12 m)
- Shape: Octagonal
- Heritage: National Register of Historic Places listed place

Light
- First lit: 1919
- Focal height: 19 m (62 ft)
- Lens: Fourth order Fresnel lens
- Range: 15 nautical miles; 27 kilometres (17 mi)
- Characteristic: White flash every 10 s
- Lime Kiln Light Station
- U.S. National Register of Historic Places
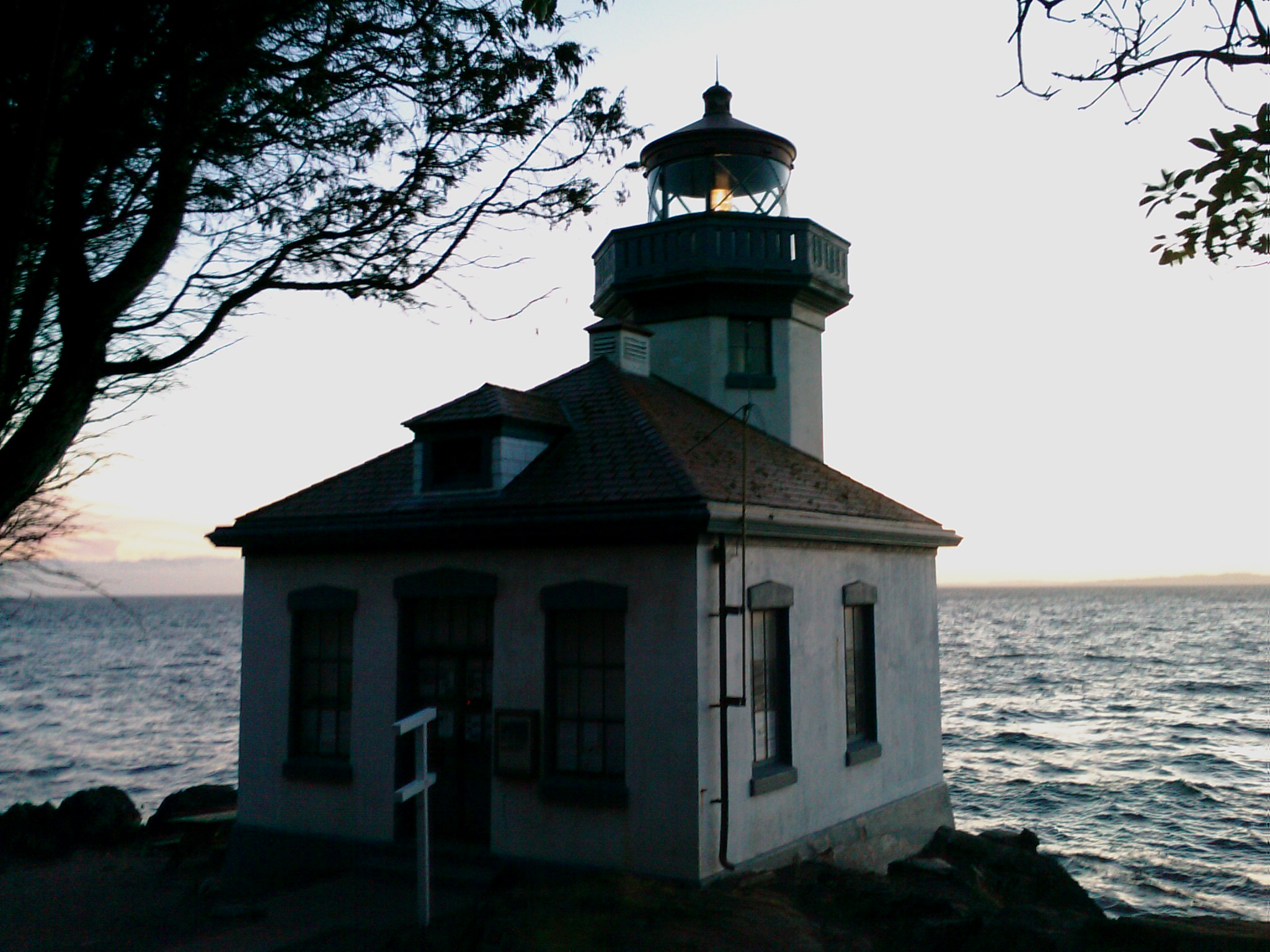
- Nearest city: Friday Harbor, Washington
- Area: 8 acres (3.2 ha)
- Built: 1917–1919
- NRHP reference No.: 78002771
- Added to NRHP: December 14, 1978

The Lime Kiln Light is a functioning navigational aid located on Lime Kiln Point overlooking Dead Man's Bay on the western side of San Juan Island, San Juan County, Washington, in the United States. It guides ships through the Haro Straits and is part of Lime Kiln Point State Park, which offers tours during summer months.

== History ==
The Lime Kiln Light was established in 1914 when acetylene lights were placed on Lime Kiln Point, a name derived from the lime kilns built there in the 1860s. It was the last major light established in Washington. The light was updated five years later with a 38-foot (12 m) octagonal concrete tower rising from the fog signal building, a design that matches the Alki Point Light in Seattle. Two keeper's houses and other structures also date from around this time. A fourth-order Fresnel lens was first exhibited from the new tower on June 30, 1919. The Coast Guard automated the Lime Kiln Lighthouse in August 1962, using photoelectric cells to turn the light on at dusk and off during daylight hours. In 1998, the drum lens was replaced with a modern optic, flashing a white light once every 10 seconds. Sitting on the rocky shoreline at a height of 55 feet (17 m), the beacon is visible for 15 nautical miles; 27 kilometres (17 mi).
