= Lime kiln =

Kiln used for the calcination of limestone

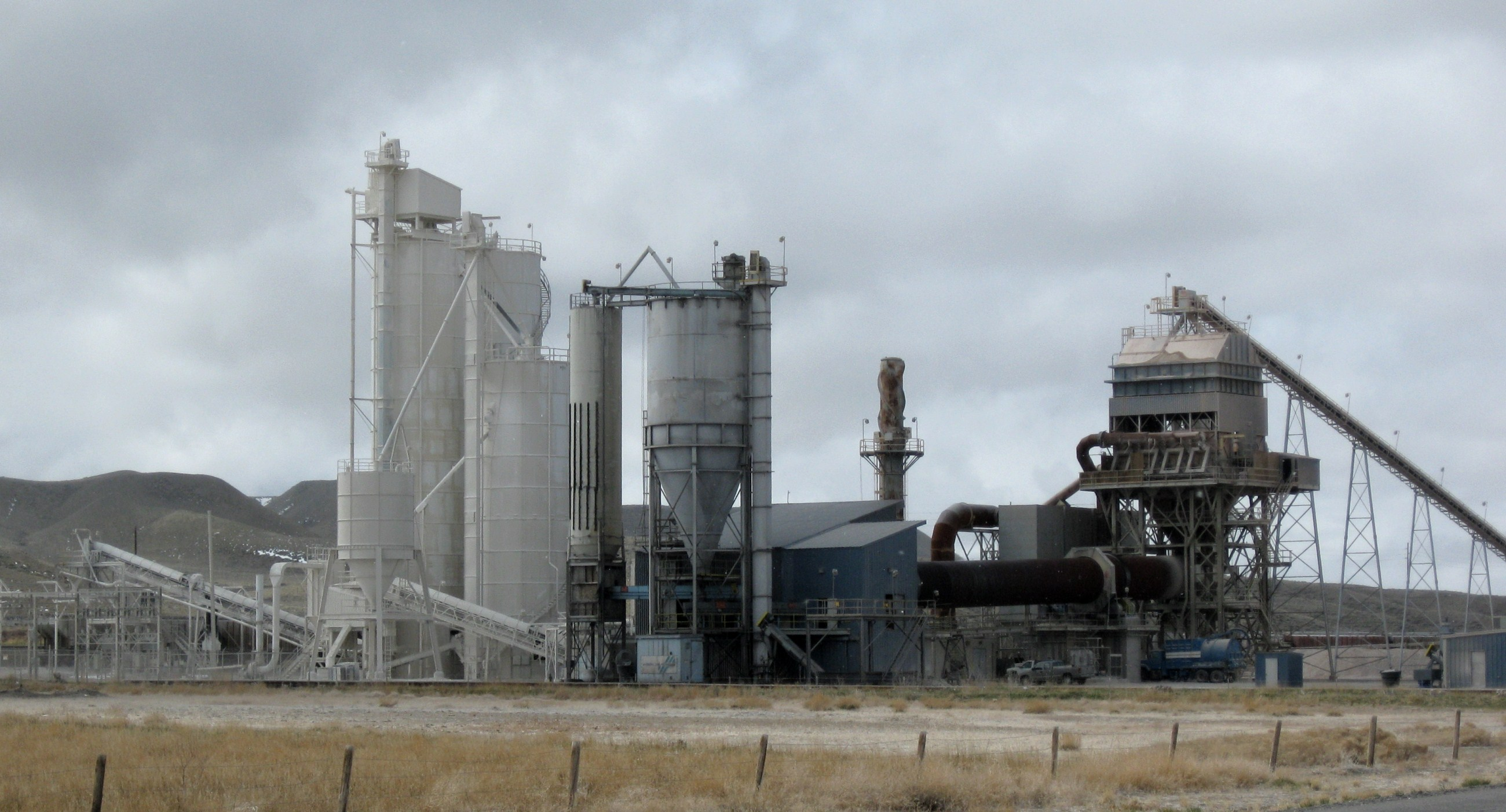
Rotary lime kiln (rust-colored horizontal tube at right) with preheater, Wyoming, 2010

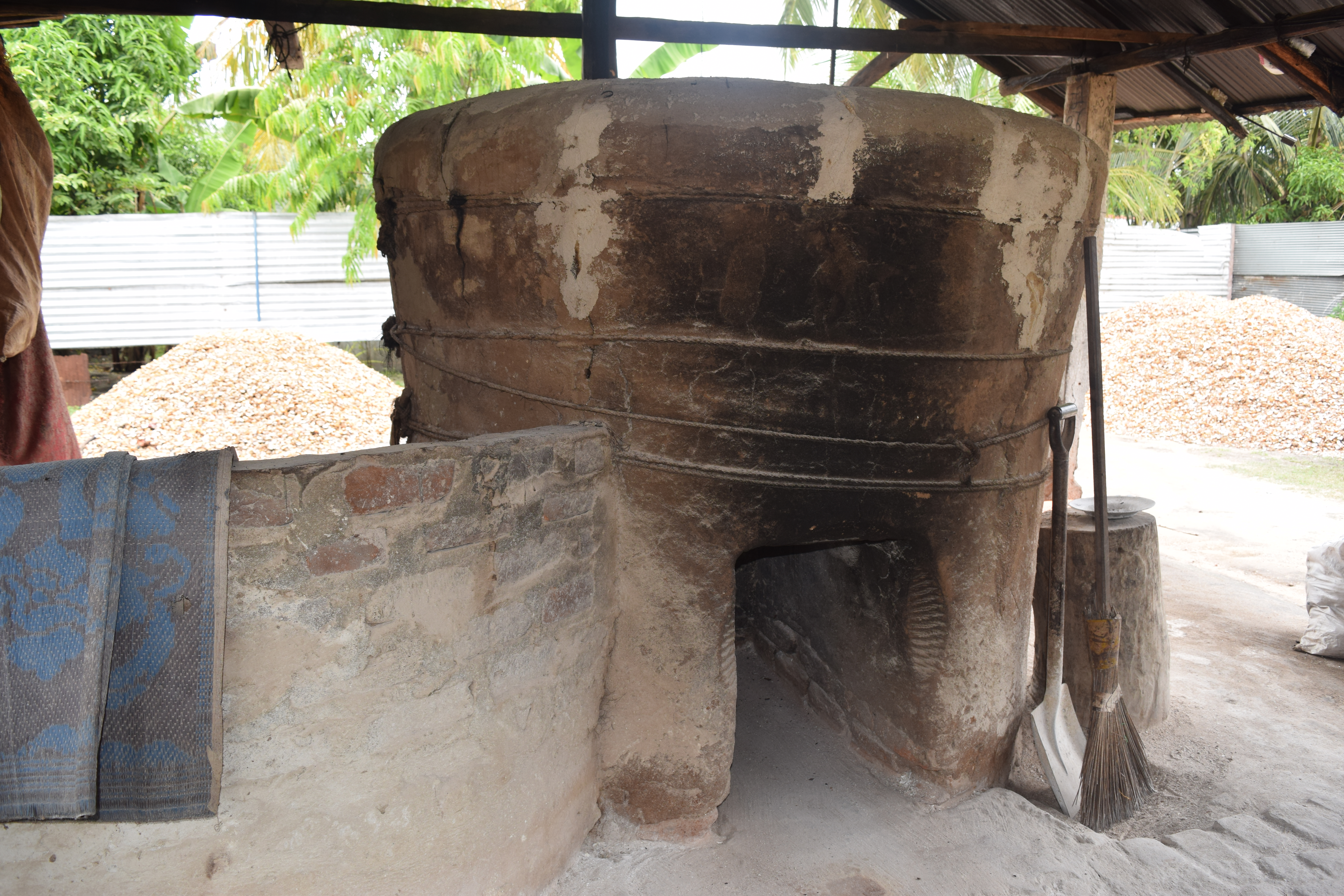
Traditional lime kiln in Sri Lanka

A lime kiln is a kiln used for the calcination of limestone (calcium carbonate) to produce the form of lime called quicklime (calcium oxide). The chemical equation for this reaction is: CaCO_{3} + heat → CaO + CO_{2}

This reaction can take place at anywhere above 840 °C (1,540 °F), but is generally considered to occur at 900 °C (1,650 °F) (at which temperature the partial pressure of CO_{2} is 1 atmosphere), but a temperature around 1,000 °C (1,830 °F) (at which temperature the partial pressure of CO_{2} is 3.8 atmospheres) is usually used to make the reaction proceed quickly. Excessive temperature is avoided because it produces unreactive, "dead-burned" lime.

Slaked lime (calcium hydroxide) can be formed by mixing quicklime with water.

== History ==
=== Pre-pottery Neolithic ===
==== In plaster, proto-pottery, and mortar ====
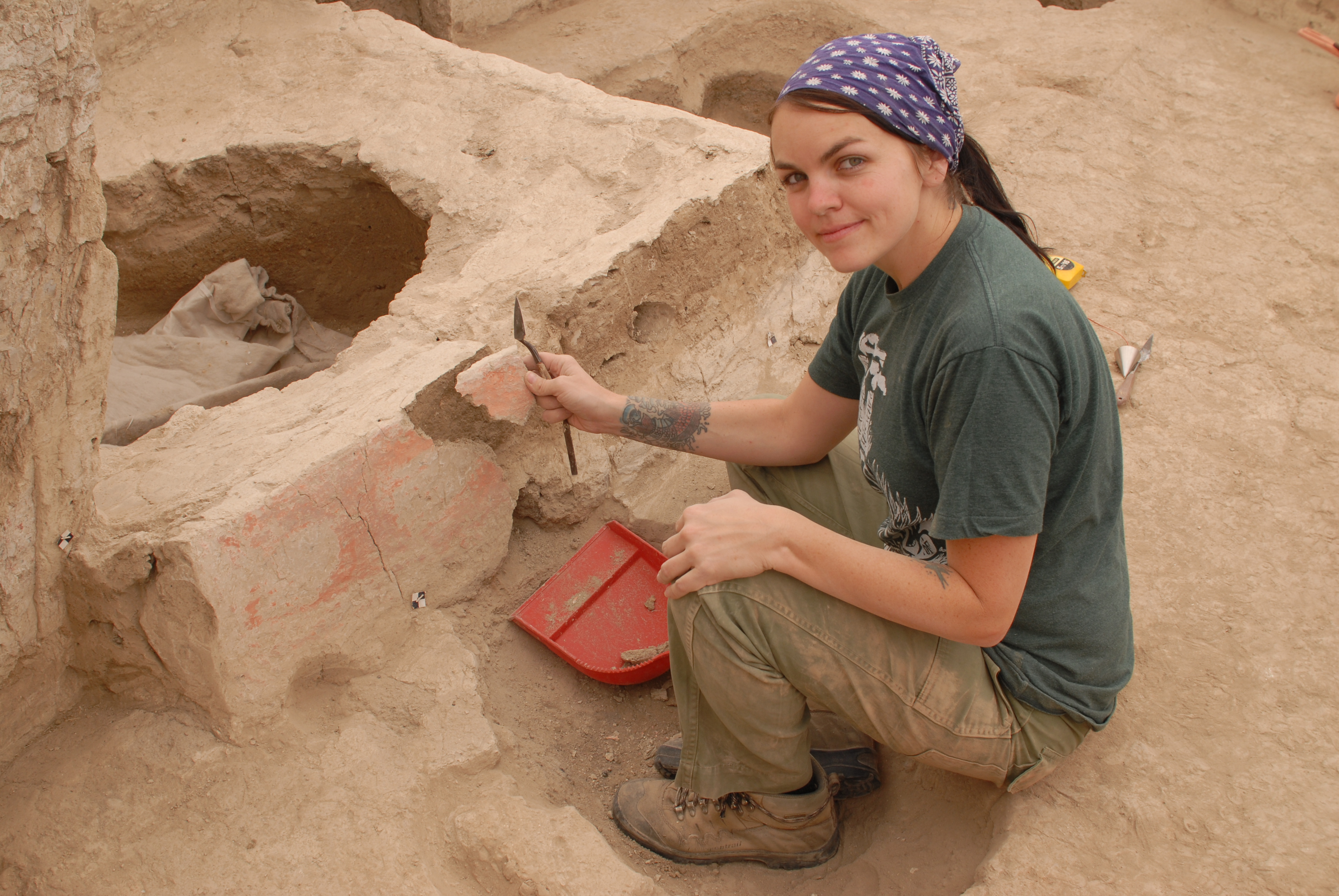
An archaeologist at Çatalhöyük

Because it is so readily made by heating limestone, lime must have been known from the earliest times, and all the early civilizations used it in building mortars and as a stabilizer in mud renders and floors. According to finds at 'Ain Ghazal in Jordan, Yiftahel in Israel, and Abu Hureyra in Syria dating to 7500–6000 BC, the earliest use of lime was mostly as a binder on floors and in plaster for coating walls. This use of plaster may in turn have led to the development of proto-pottery, made from lime and ash. In mortar, the oldest binder was mud. According to finds at Catal Hüyük in Turkey, mud was soon followed by clay, and then by lime in the 6th millennium BC.

=== Lime use in agriculture and coal ===
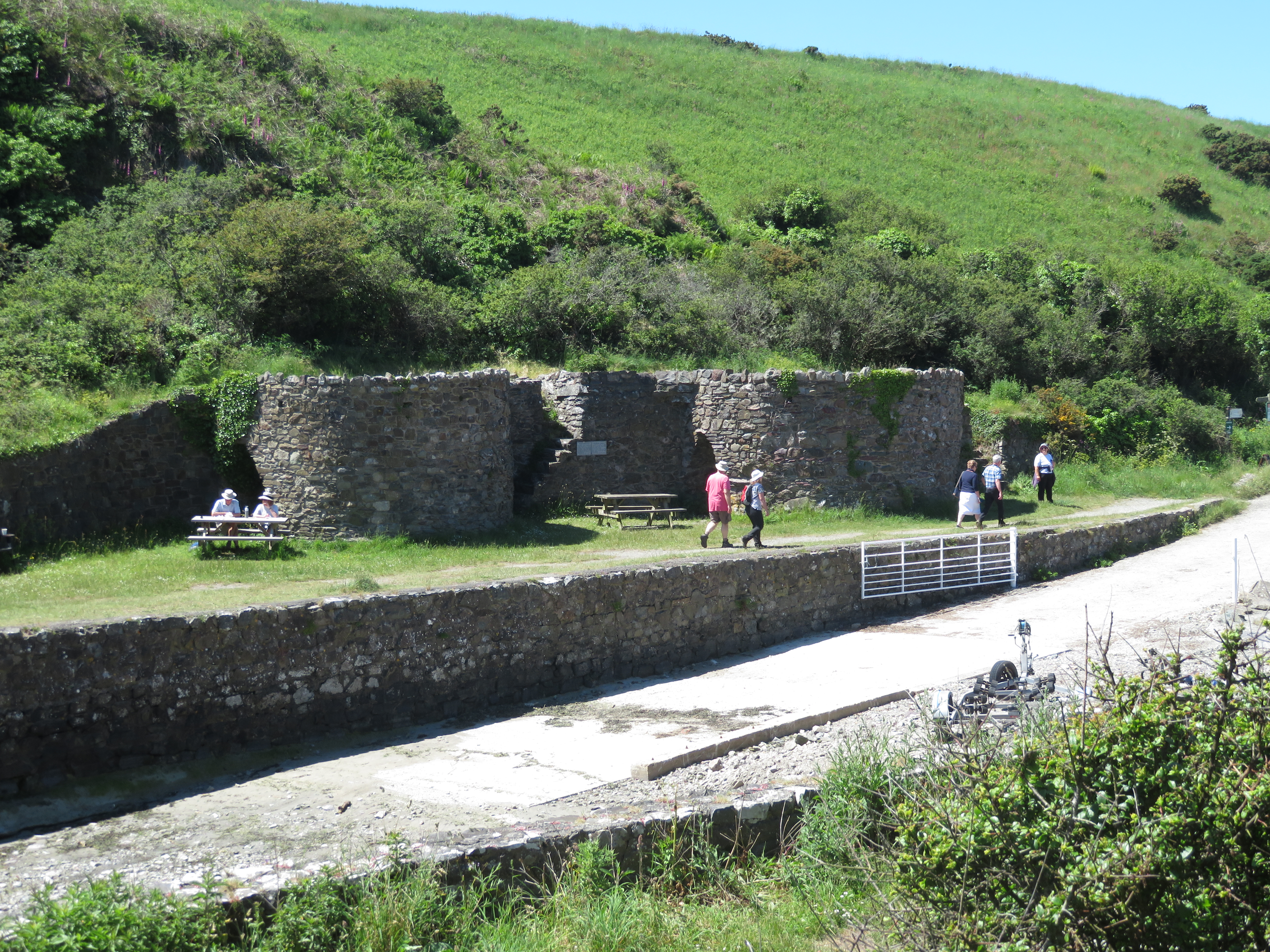
Lime kilns in Porth Clais, Wales; 2021

Knowledge of its value in agriculture is also ancient, but agricultural use only became widely possible when the use of coal made it cheap in the coalfields in the late 13th century, and an account of agricultural use was given in 1523. The earliest descriptions of lime kilns differ little from those used for small-scale manufacture a century ago. Because land transportation of minerals like limestone and coal was difficult in the pre-industrial era, they were distributed by sea, and lime was most often manufactured at small coastal ports. Many preserved kilns are still to be seen on quaysides around the coasts of Britain.

=== Types of kilns ===
Drone video of ruins of limestone ring kiln at Tamsalu, Estonia 2021

Permanent lime kilns fall into two broad categories: "flare kilns" also known as "intermittent" or "periodic" kilns; and "draw kilns" also known as "perpetual" or "running" kilns. In a flare kiln, a bottom layer of coal was built up and the kiln above filled solely with chalk. The fire was alight for several days, and then the entire kiln was emptied of the lime.

In a draw kiln, usually a stone structure, the chalk or limestone was layered with wood, coal or coke and lit. As it burnt through, lime was extracted from the bottom of the kiln, through the draw hole. Further layers of stone and fuel were added to the top.

=== Early kilns ===
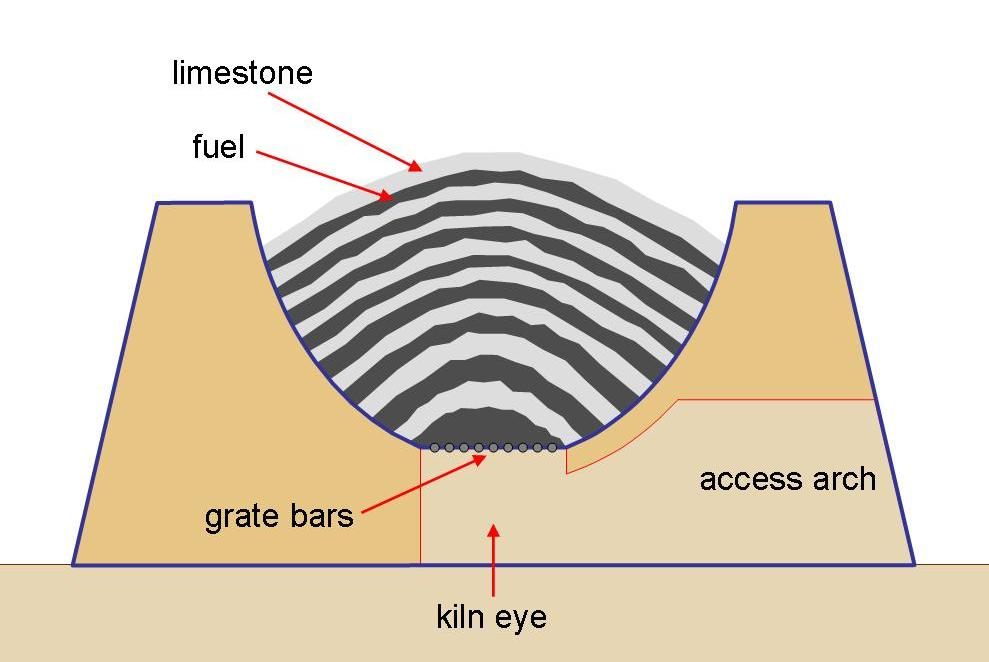
Cross section of typical early kiln

The common feature of early kilns was an egg-cup shaped burning chamber, with an air inlet at the base (the "eye"), constructed of brick. Limestone was crushed (often by hand) to fairly uniform 20–60 mm (1–2 1/2 in) lumps – fine stone was rejected. Successive dome-shaped layers of limestone and wood or coal were built up in the kiln on grate bars across the eye. When loading was complete, the kiln was kindled at the bottom, and the fire gradually spread upwards through the charge. When burnt through, the lime was cooled and raked out through the base. Fine ash dropped out and was rejected with the "riddlings".

Only lump stone could be used, because the charge needed to "breathe" during firing. This also limited the size of kilns and explains why kilns were all much the same size. Above a certain diameter, the half-burned charge would be likely to collapse under its own weight, extinguishing the fire. So kilns always made 25–30 tonnes of lime in a batch. Typically the kiln took a day to load, three days to fire, two days to cool and a day to unload, so a one-week turnaround was normal. The degree of burning was controlled by trial and error from batch to batch by varying the amount of fuel used. Because there were large temperature differences between the center of the charge and the material close to the wall, a mixture of underburned (i.e. high loss on ignition), well-burned and dead-burned lime was normally produced. Typical fuel efficiency was low, with 0.5 tonnes or more of coal being used per tonne of finished lime (15 MJ/kg).

=== Industrial scale production ===
Lime production was sometimes carried out on an industrial scale. One example at Annery in North Devon, England, near Great Torrington, was made up of three kilns grouped together in an 'L' shape and was situated beside the Torrington canal and the River Torridge to bring in the limestone and coal, and to transport away the calcined lime in the days before properly metalled roads existed.

Sets of seven kilns were common. A loading gang and an unloading gang would work the kilns in rotation through the week.

A rarely used kiln was known as a "lazy kiln".

=== Australia ===
In the late 19th and early 20th centuries the town of Waratah in Gippsland, Victoria, Australia produced a majority of the quicklime used in the city of Melbourne as well as around other parts of Gippsland. The town, now called Walkerville, was set on an isolated part of the Victorian coastline and exported the lime by ship. When this became unprofitable in 1926 the kilns were shut down. The present-day area, though having no town amenities as such, markets itself as a tourist destination. The ruins of the lime kilns can still be seen today.

Lime burning kilns in Australia

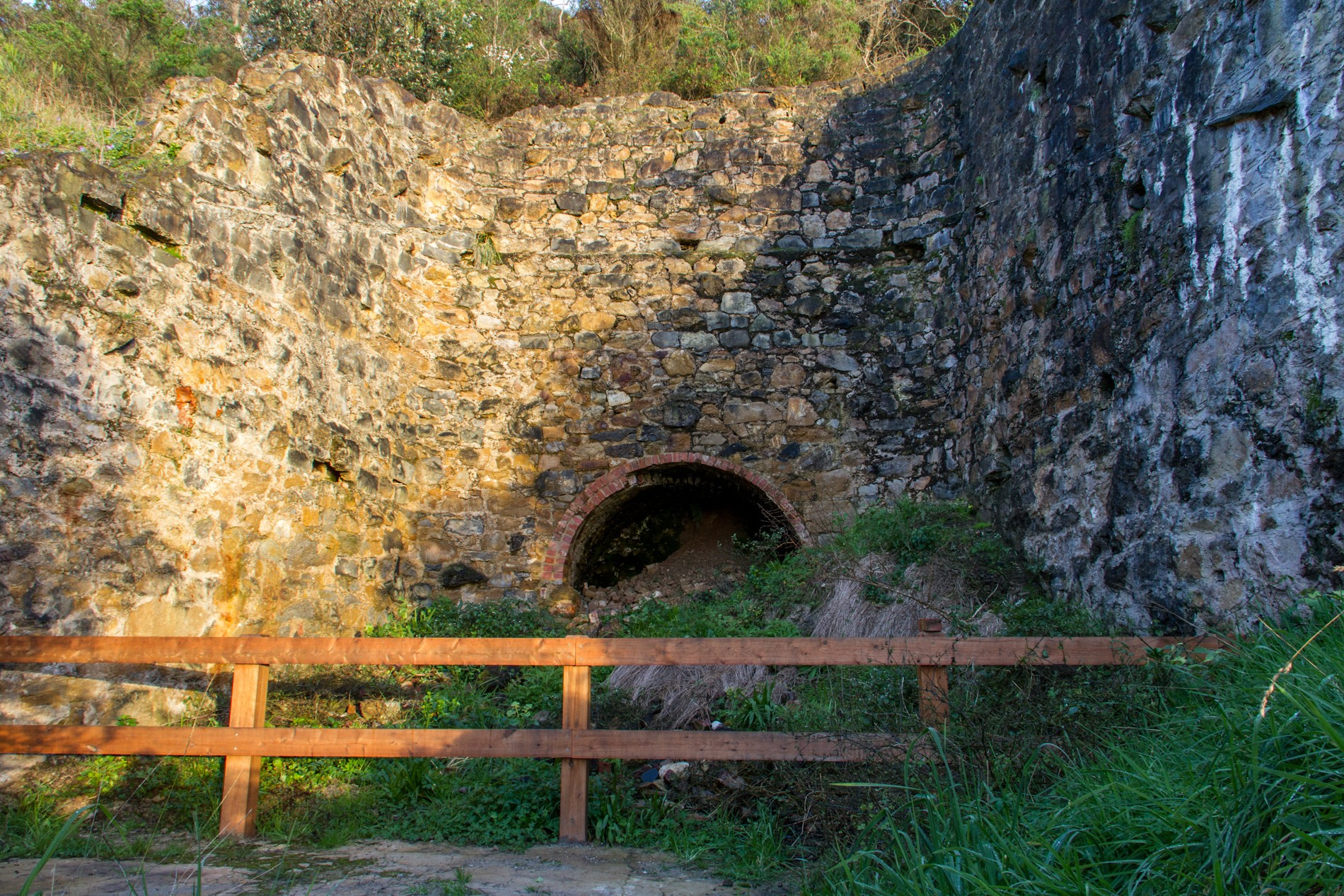
Limestone kiln ruin at Walkerville, Victoria, Australia

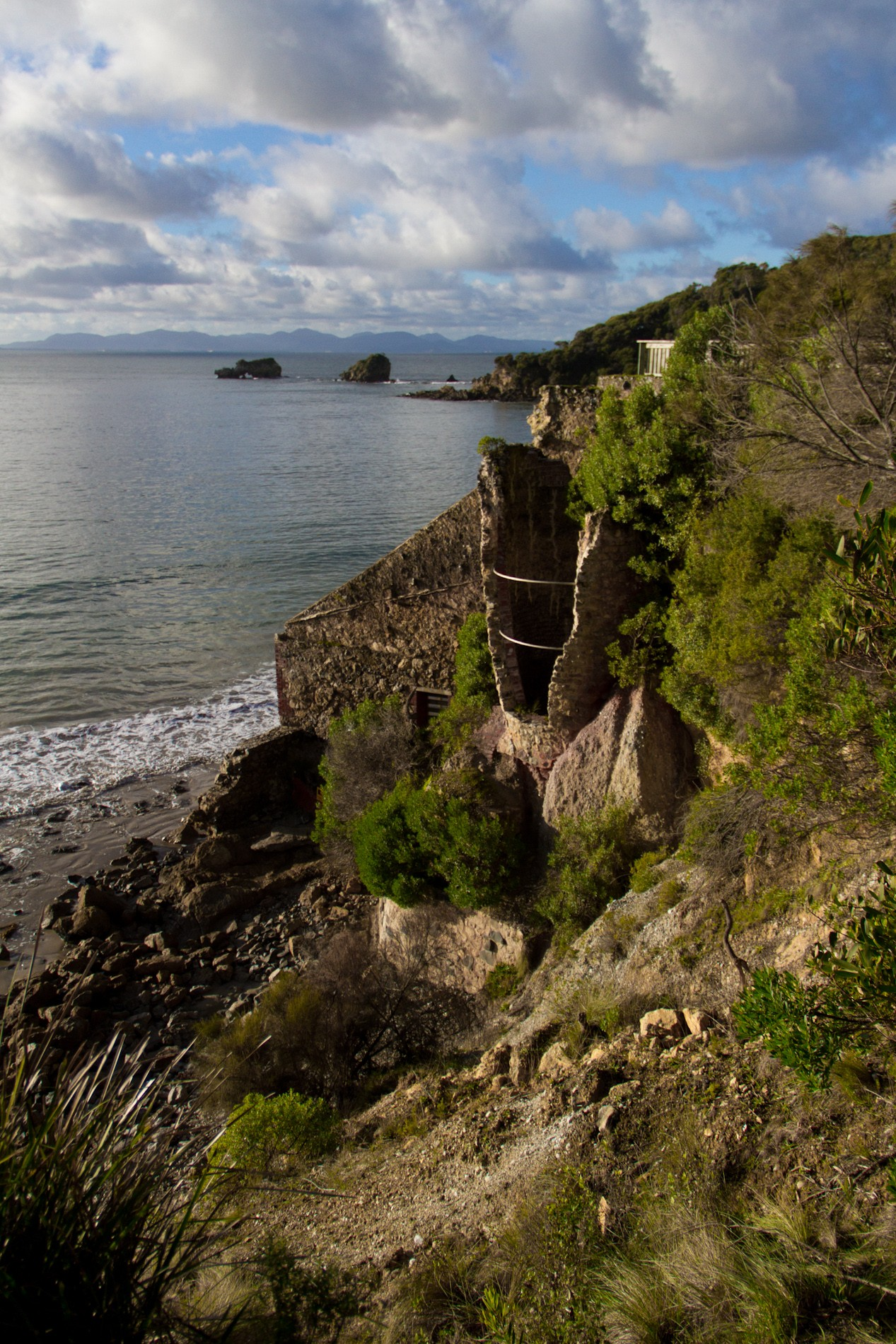
Limestone kiln ruin as seen from bushwalking track, Walkerville, Victoria, Australia

A lime kiln also existed in Wool Bay, South Australia.

Lime kiln, Wool Bay

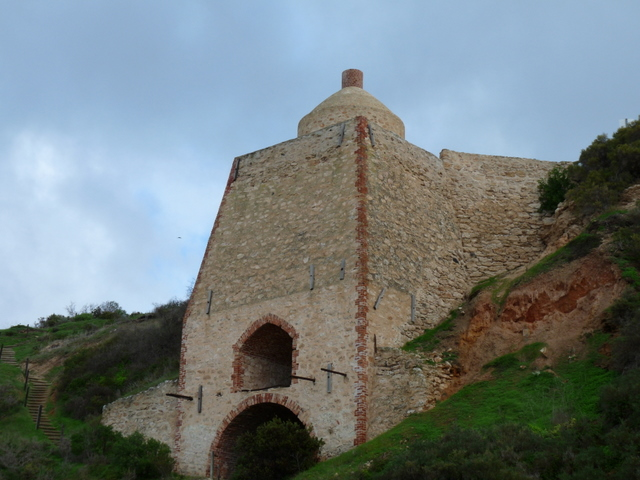

=== Ukraine ===
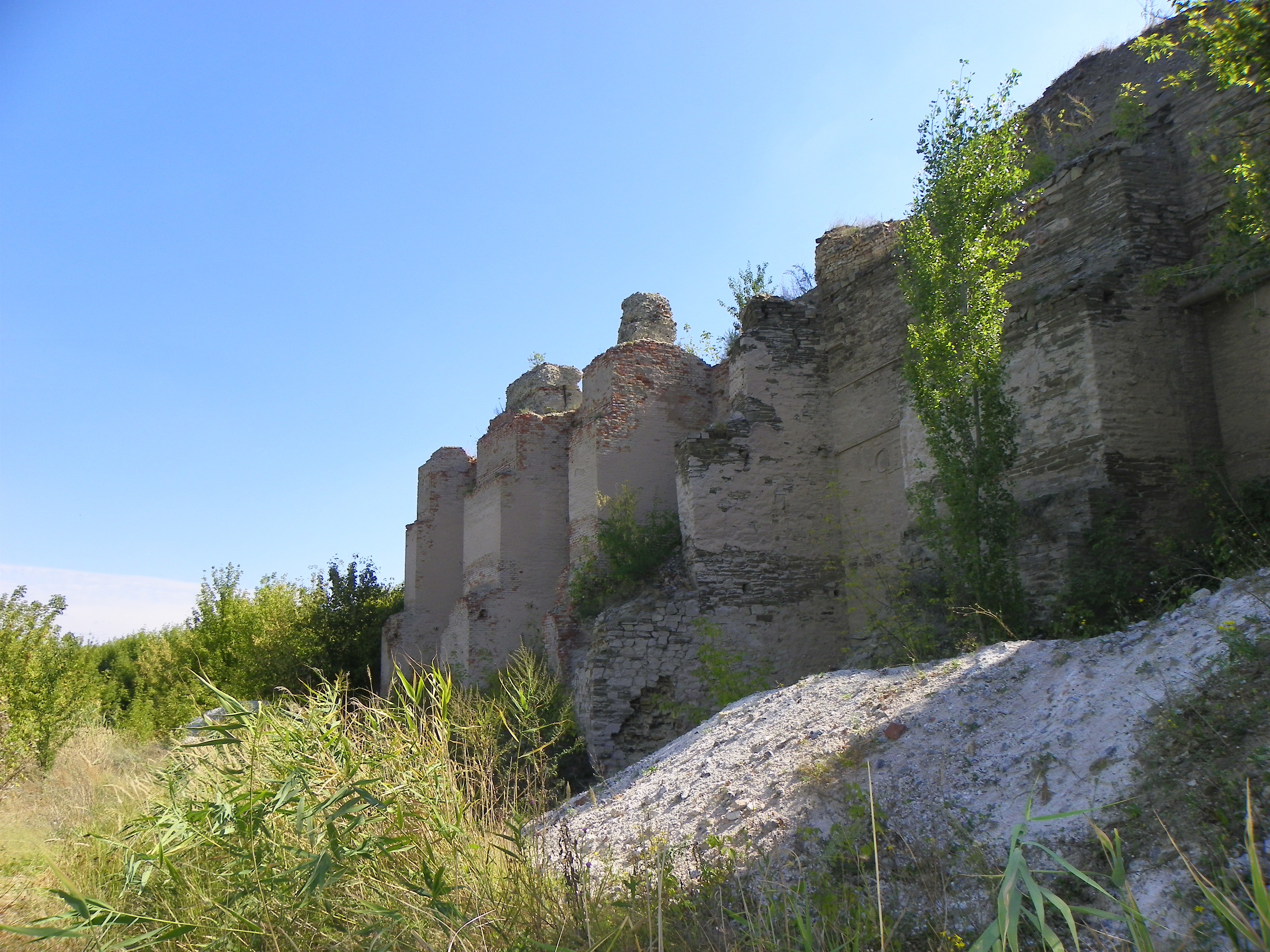
Old lime kilns in Manzhykiv Kut, Ukraine

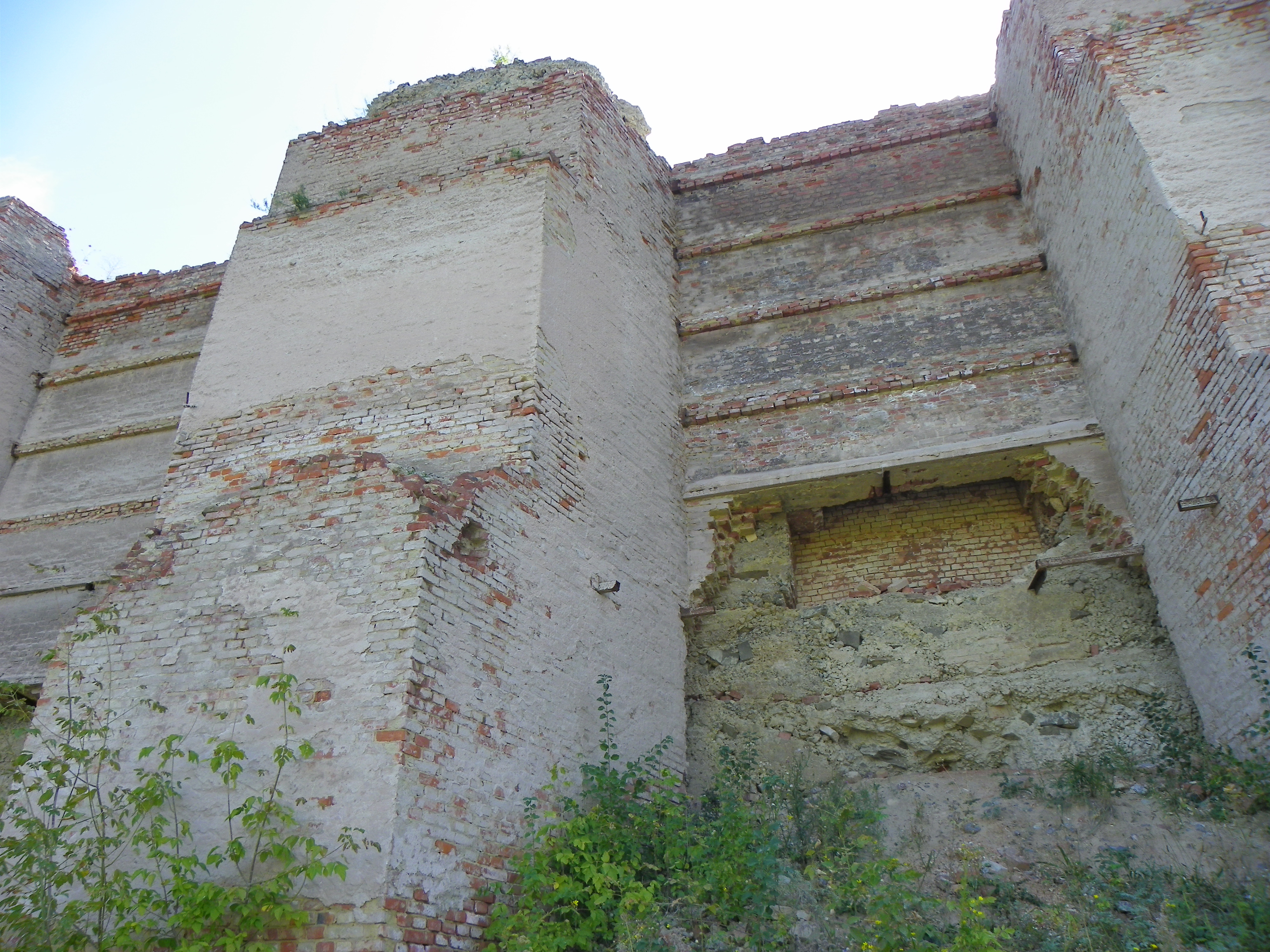
Old lime kilns in Manzhykiv Kut, Ukraine

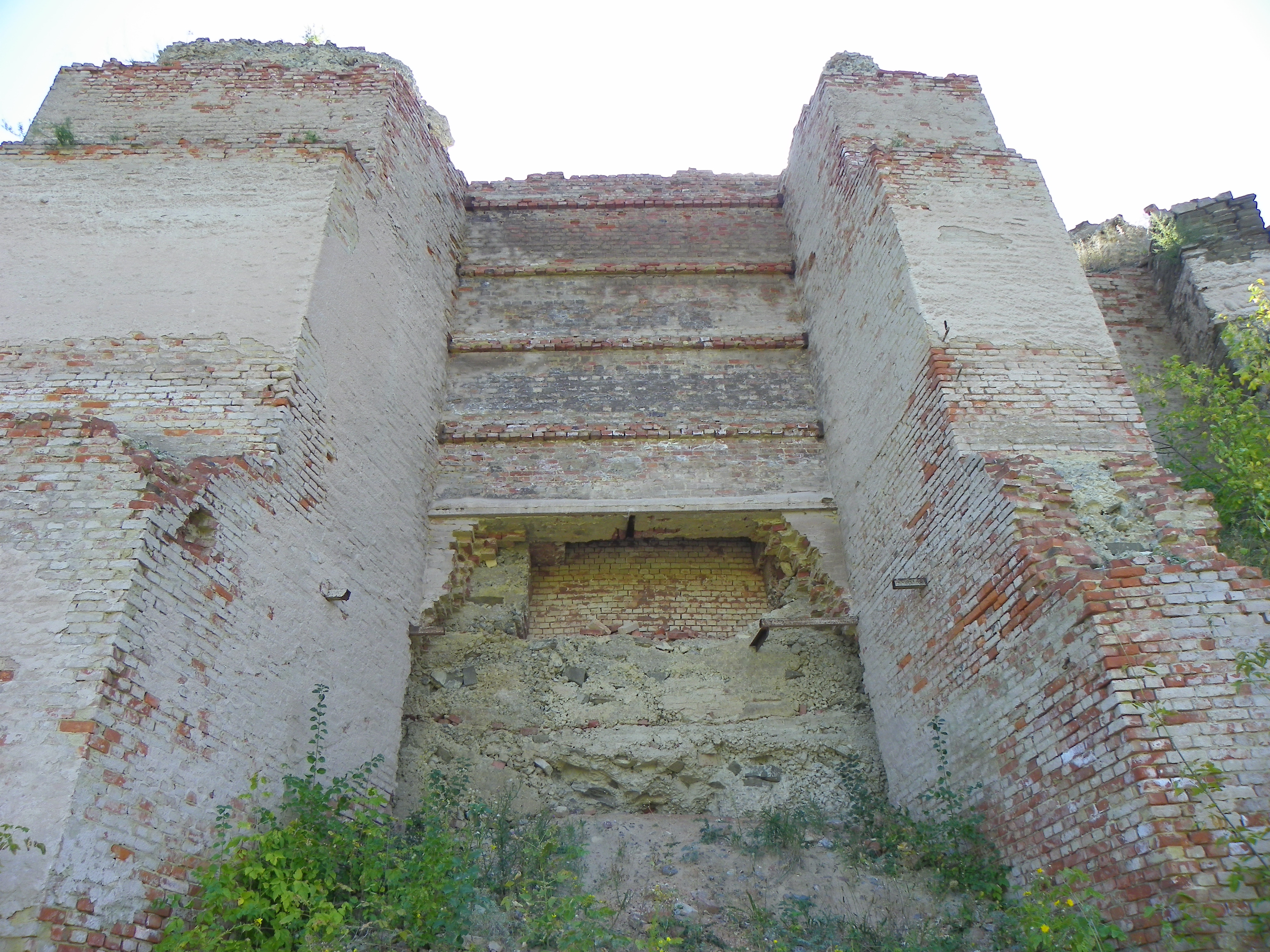
Old lime kilns in Manzhykiv Kut, Ukraine

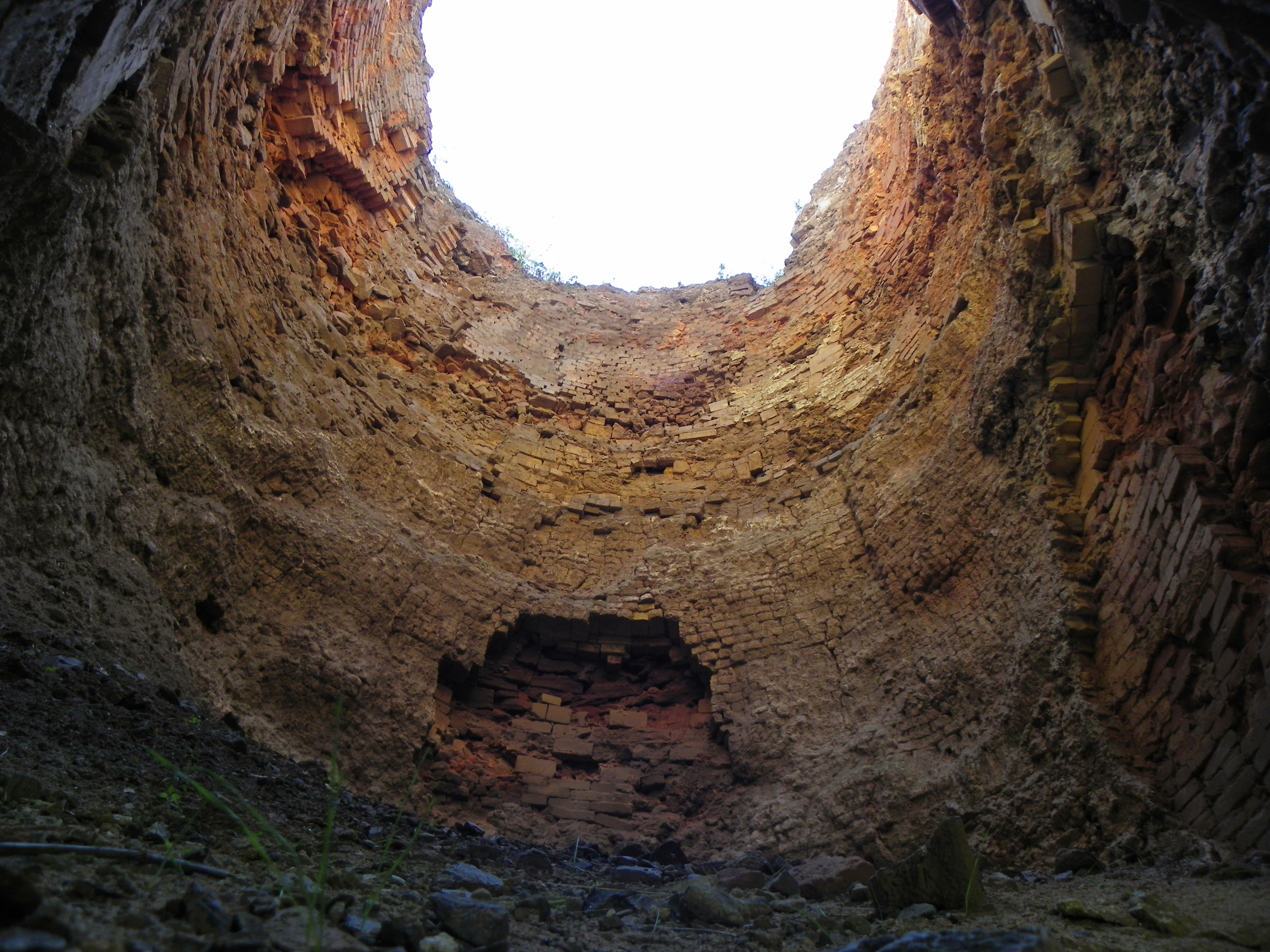
Old lime kilns in Manzhykiv Kut, Ukraine

=== United Kingdom ===
The large kiln at Crindledykes near Haydon Bridge, Northumbria, was one of more than 300 in the county. It was unique to the area in having four draw arches to a single pot. As production was cut back, the two side arches were blocked up, but were restored in 1989 by English Heritage.

The development of the national rail network made the local small-scale kilns increasingly unprofitable, and they gradually died out through the 19th century. They were replaced by larger industrial plants. At the same time, new uses for lime in the chemical, steel and sugar industries led to large-scale plants. These also saw the development of more efficient kilns.

A lime kiln erected at Dudley, West Midlands (formerly Worcestershire) in 1842 survives as part of the Black Country Living Museum which opened in 1976, although the kilns were last used during the 1920s. It is now among the last in a region which was dominated by coalmining and limestone mining for generations until the 1960s.

Limeburning kilns in Great Britain

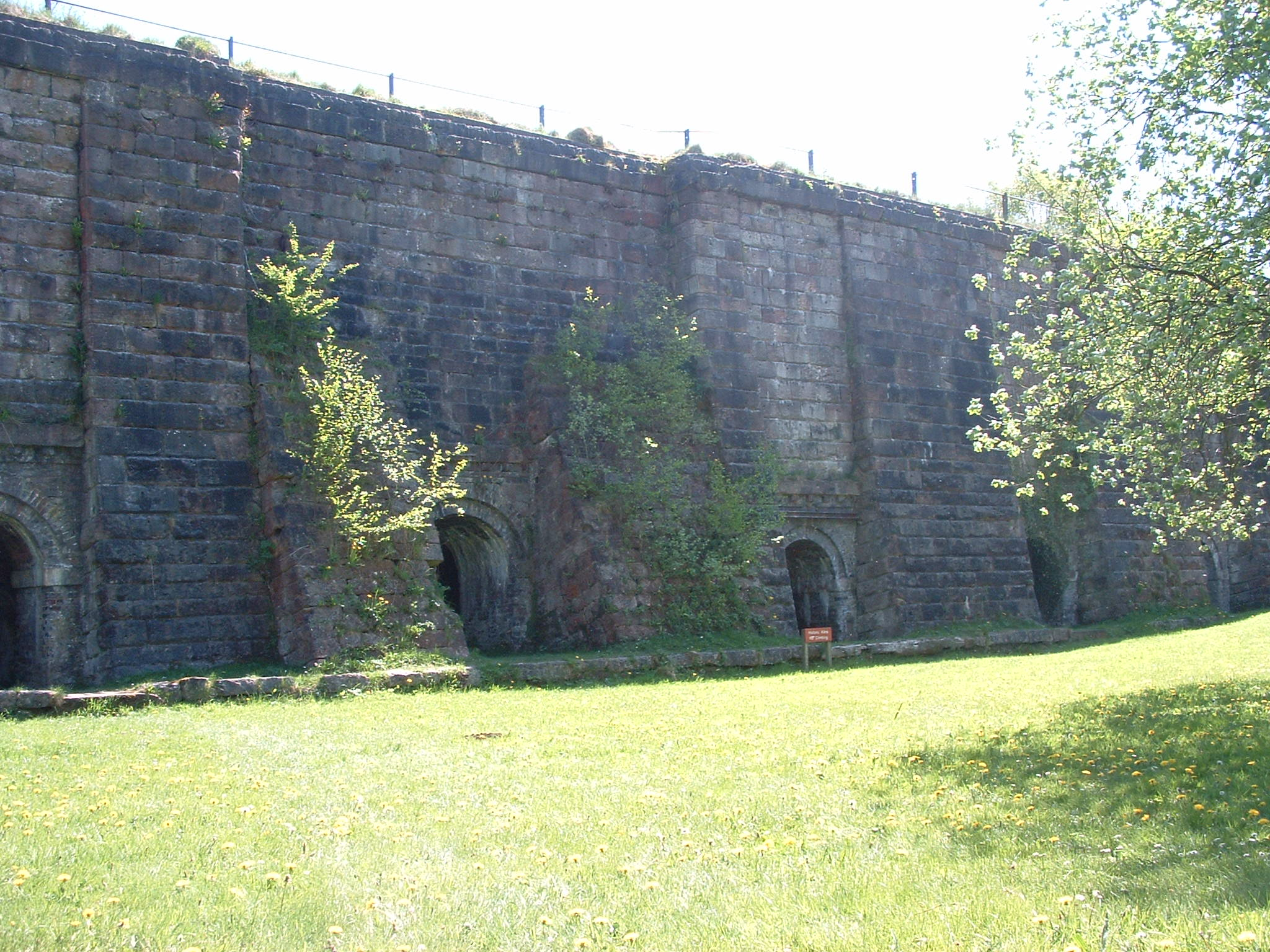
19th century limekilns at Froghall

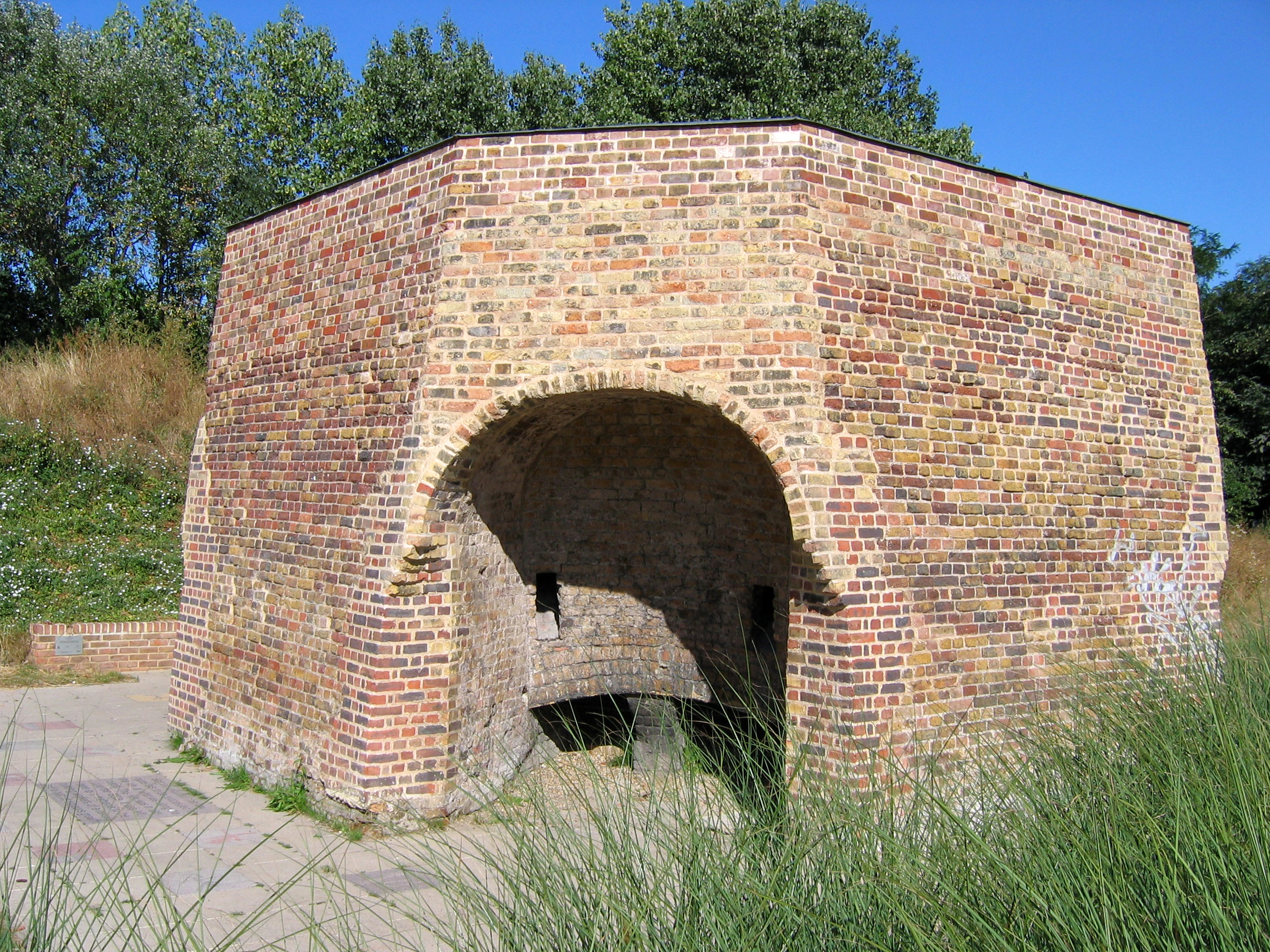
A preserved lime kiln in Burgess Park, London

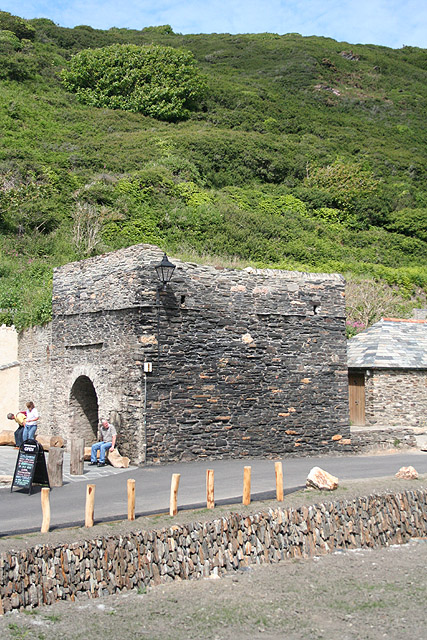
Old lime kiln, Boscastle, Cornwall

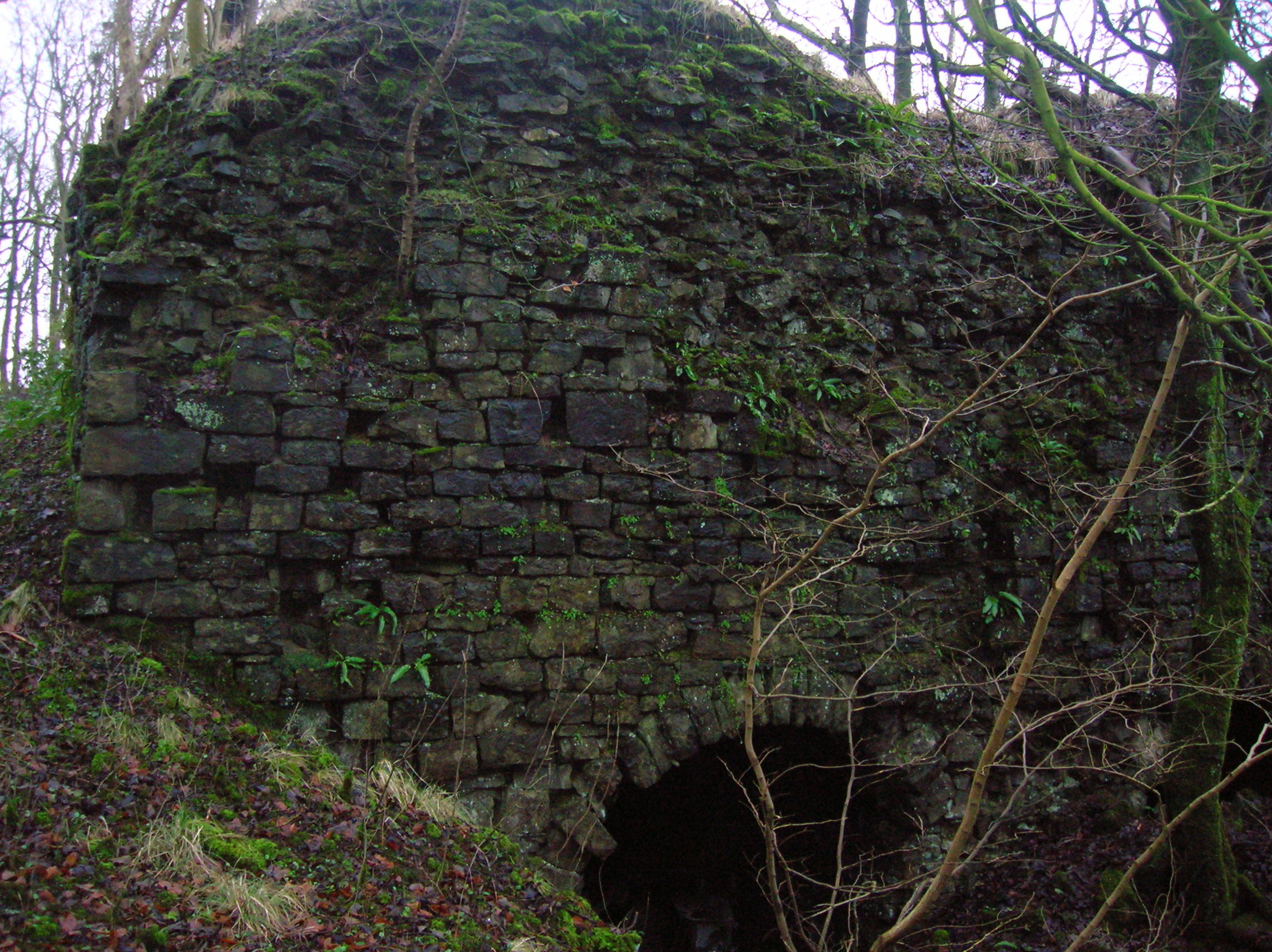
A large limekiln at Broadstone, Beith, Ayrshire

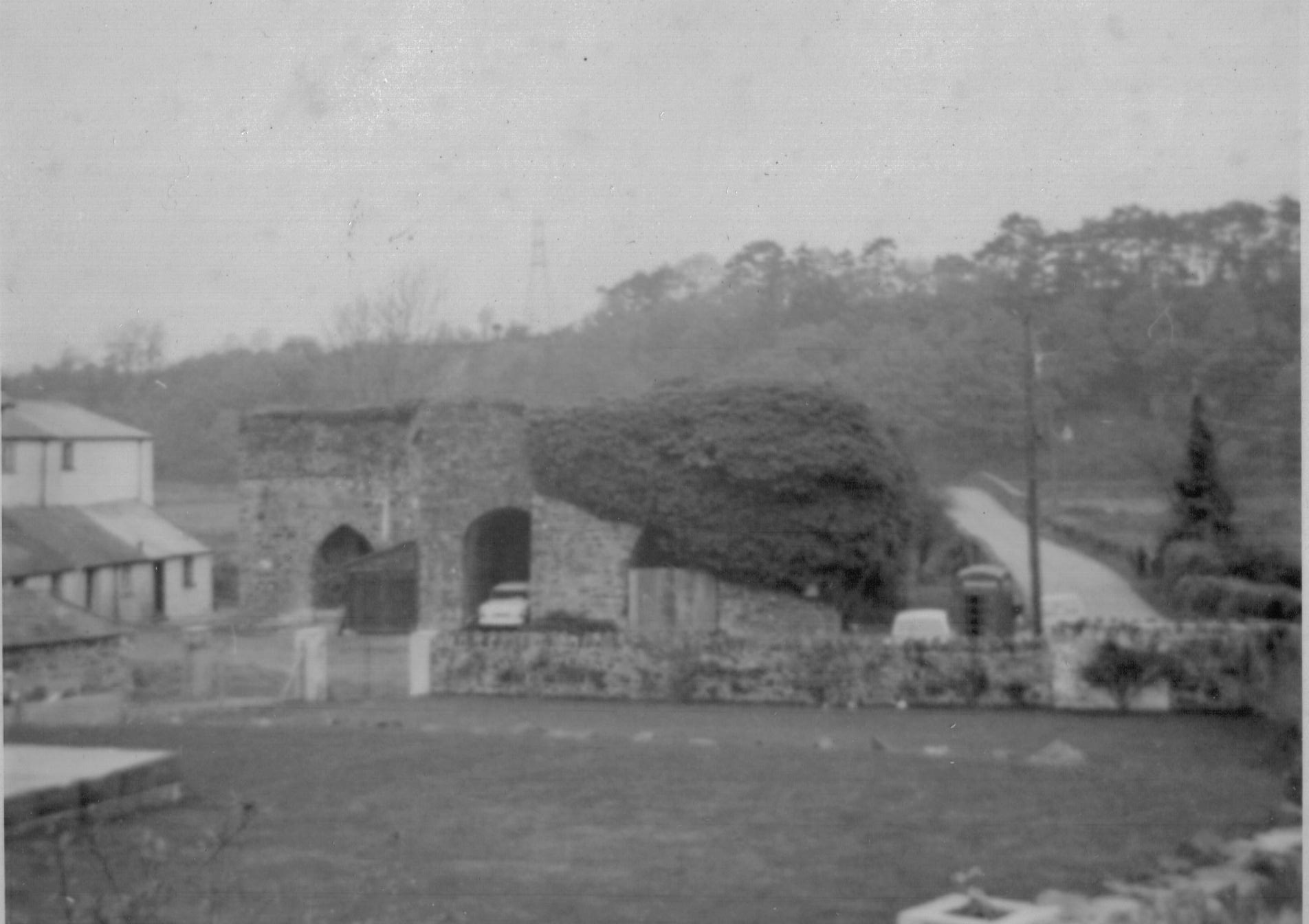
The Annery kiln in Devon, England

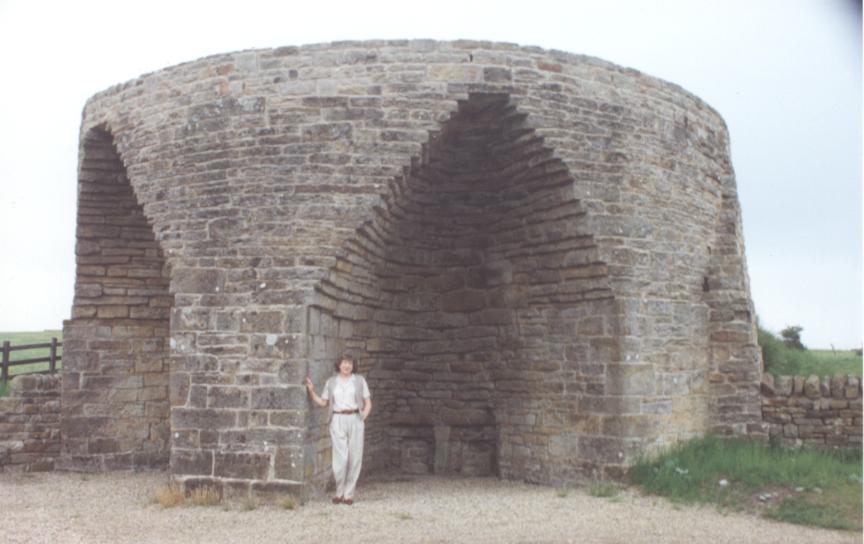
Large 19th-century single limekiln at Crindledykes near Housesteads Northumbria

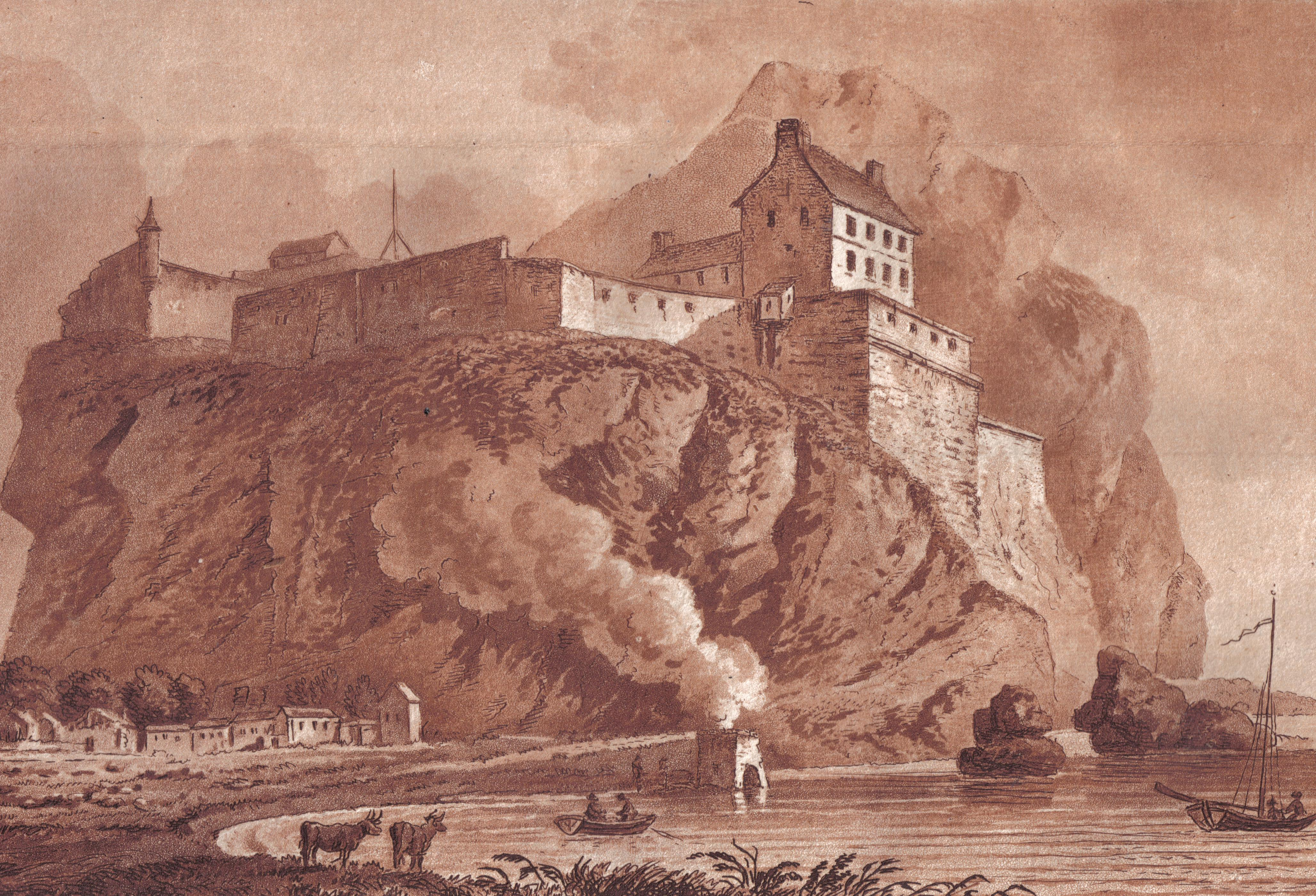
Dumbarton castle in 1800 and functioning lime kiln with smoke in the foreground

=== Other countries ===
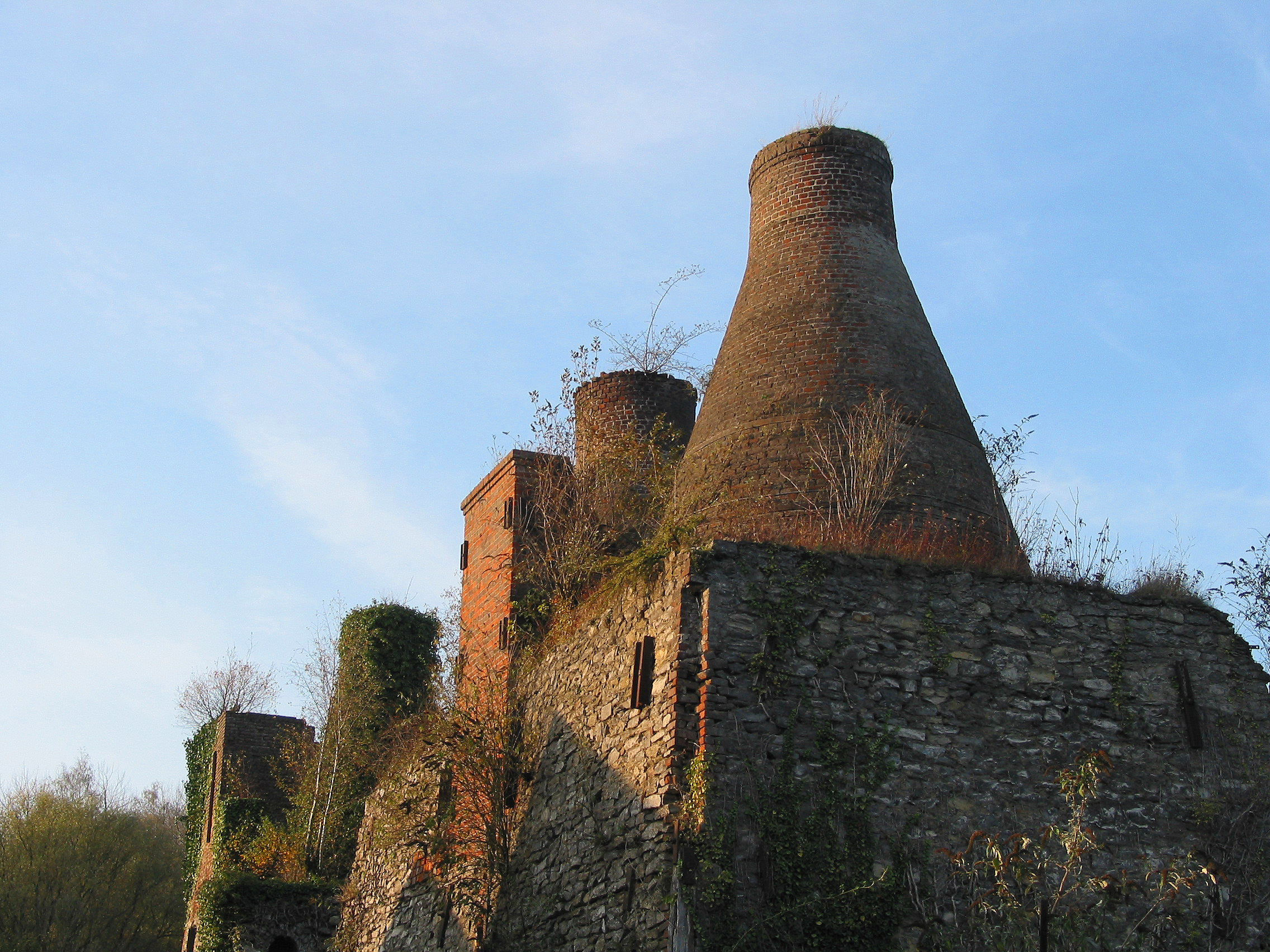
Old lime kilns, Antoing, Belgium

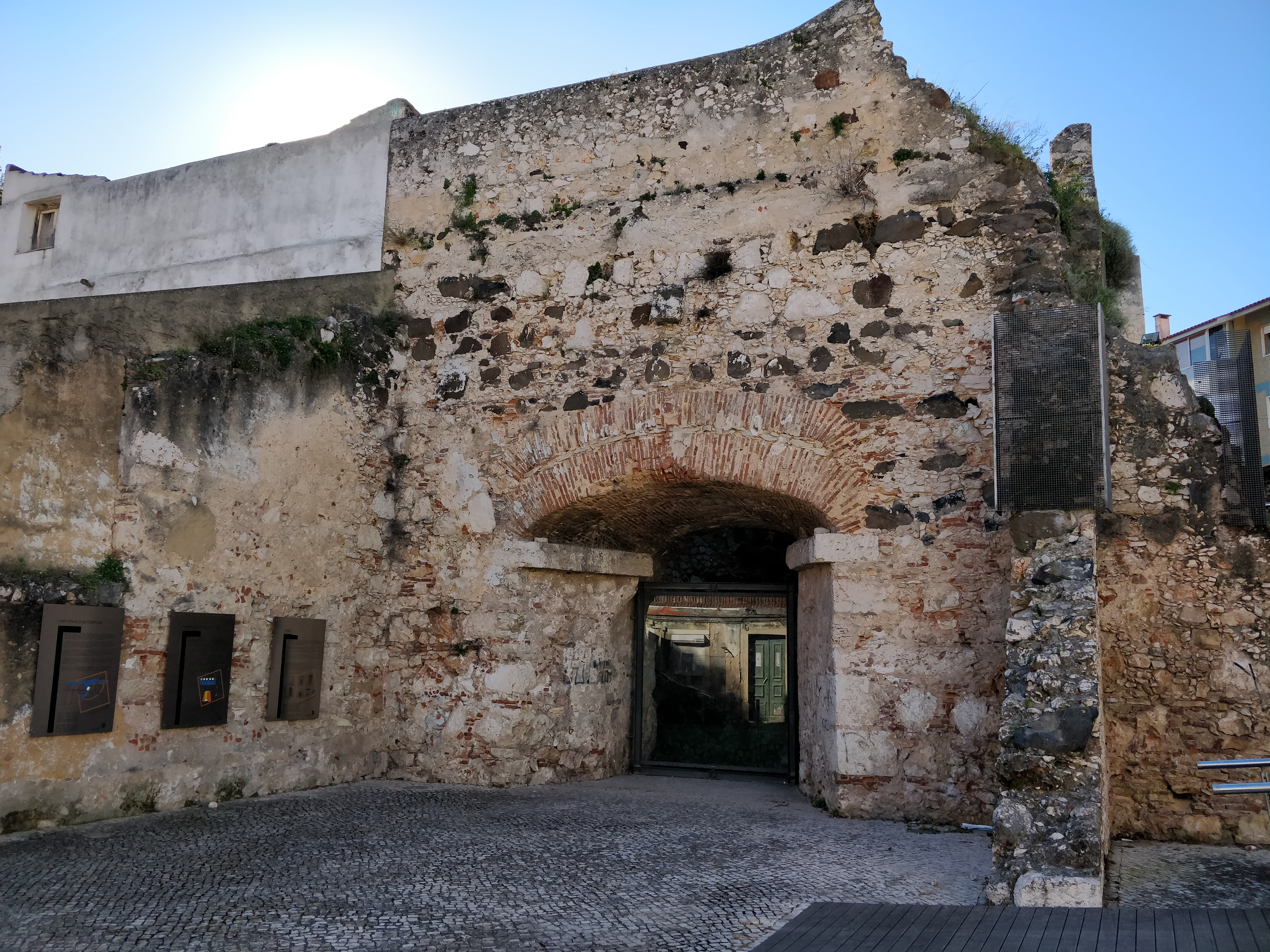
Lime kilns, Oeiras, Portugal

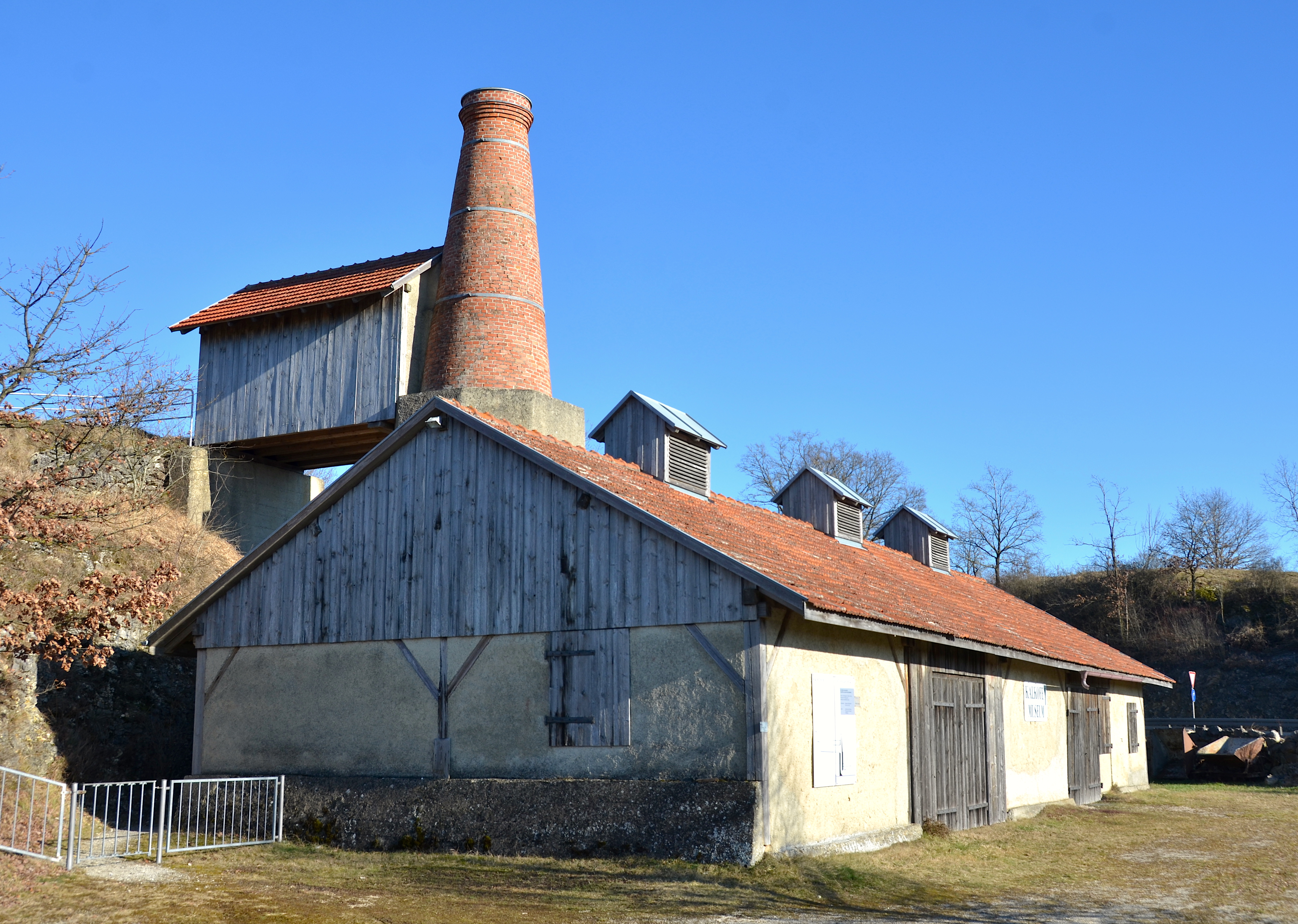
Lime kiln Untermarchtal, Baden-Württemberg

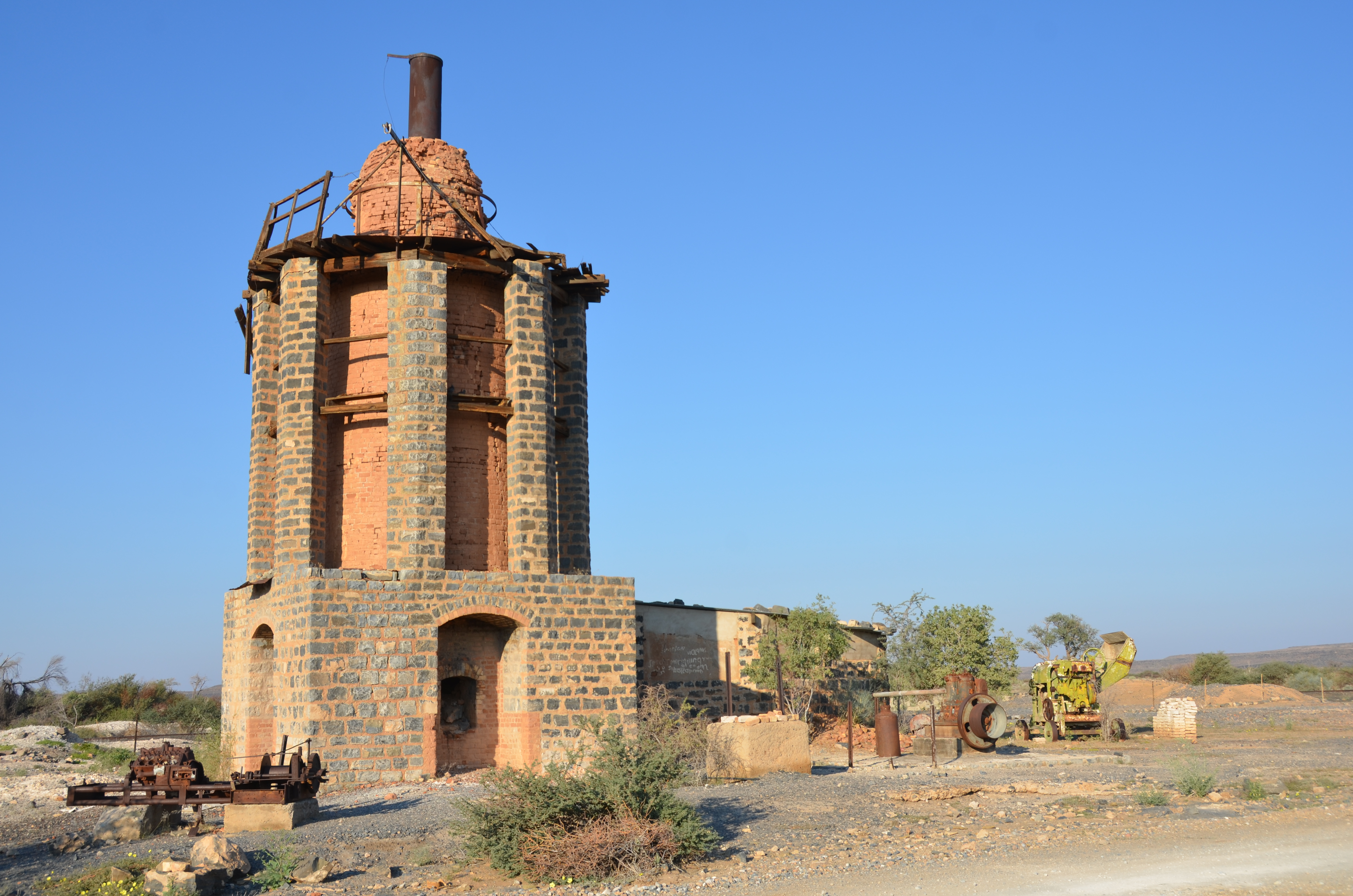
Lime kiln from 1906 at Simplon, Namibia

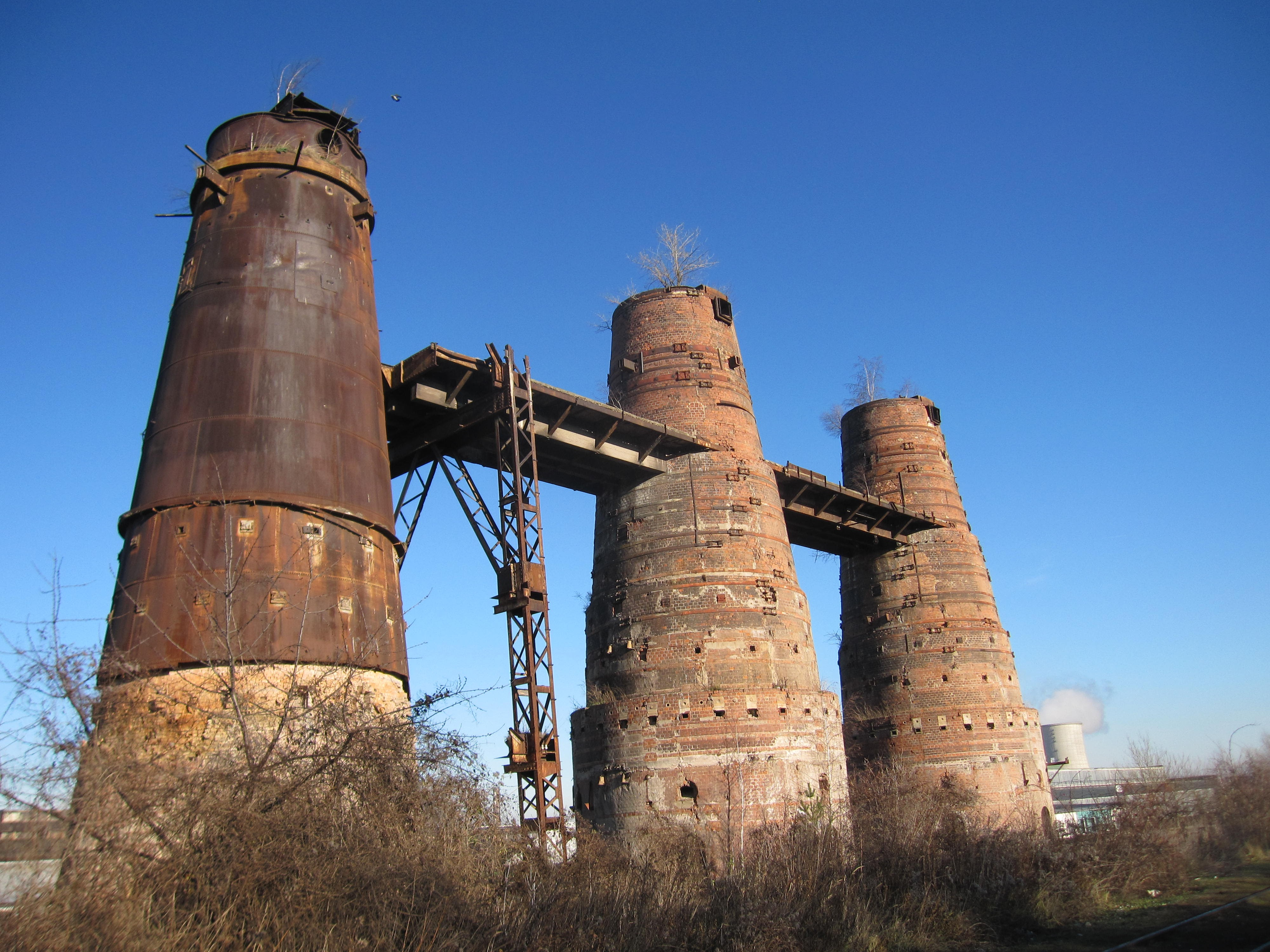
Lime Kilns in Kladno, Czechia, operable until 1975.

== Modern kilns ==
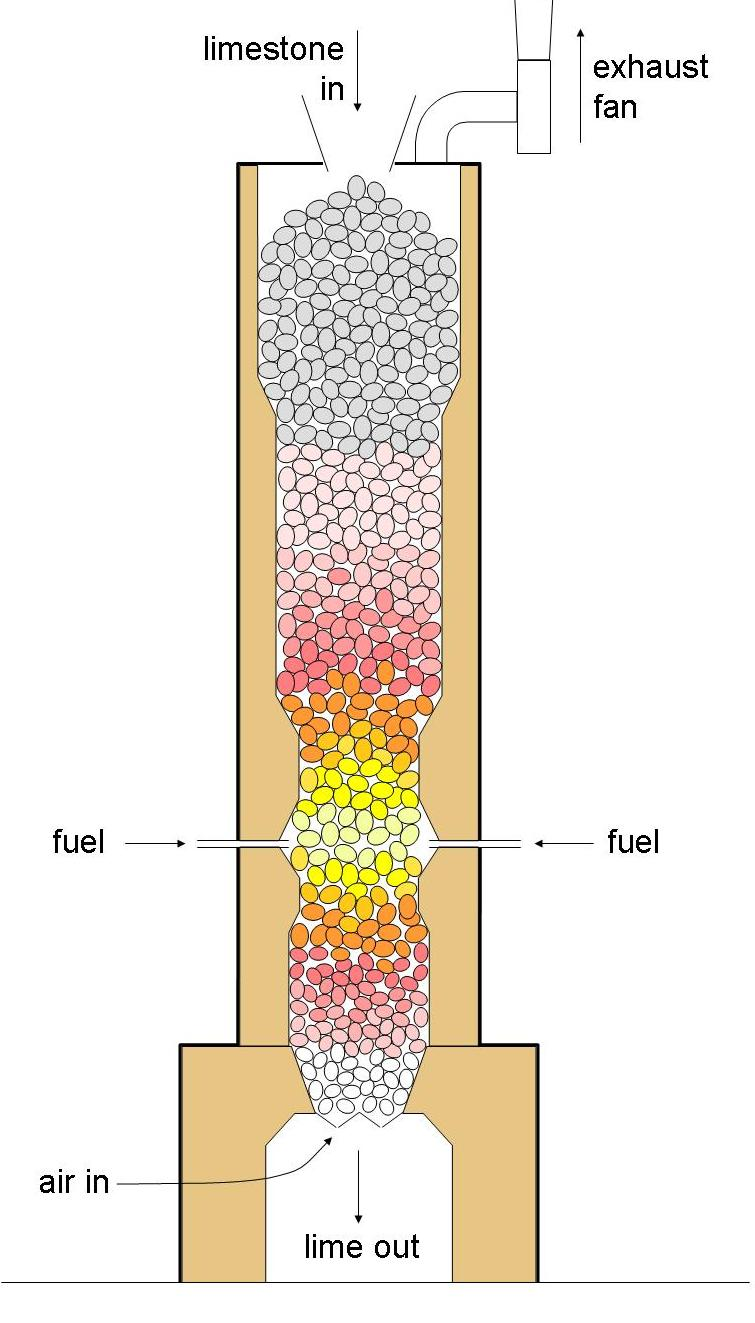
Cross section of simple shaft kiln

=== Shaft kilns ===
The theoretical heat (the standard enthalpy) of reaction required to make high-calcium lime is around 3.15 MJ per kg of lime, so the batch kilns were only around 20% efficient. The key to development in efficiency was the invention of continuous kilns, avoiding the wasteful heat-up and cool-down cycles of the batch kilns. The first were simple shaft kilns, similar in construction to blast furnaces. These are counter-current shaft kilns. Modern variants include regenerative and annular kilns. Output is usually in the range 100–500 tonnes per day.

=== Counter-current shaft kilns ===
The fuel is injected part-way up the shaft, producing maximum temperature at this point. The fresh feed fed in at the top is first dried then heated to 800 °C, where de-carbonation begins, and proceeds progressively faster as the temperature rises. Below the burner, the hot lime transfers heat to, and is cooled by, the combustion air. A mechanical grate withdraws the lime at the bottom. A fan draws the gases through the kiln, and the level in the kiln is kept constant by adding feed through an airlock. As with batch kilns, only large, graded stone can be used, in order to ensure uniform gas-flows through the charge. The degree of burning can be adjusted by changing the rate of withdrawal of lime. Heat consumption as low as 4 MJ/kg is possible, but 4.5 to 5 MJ/kg is more typical. Due to temperature peak at the burners up to 1200 °C in a shaft kiln conditions are ideal to produce medium and hard burned lime.

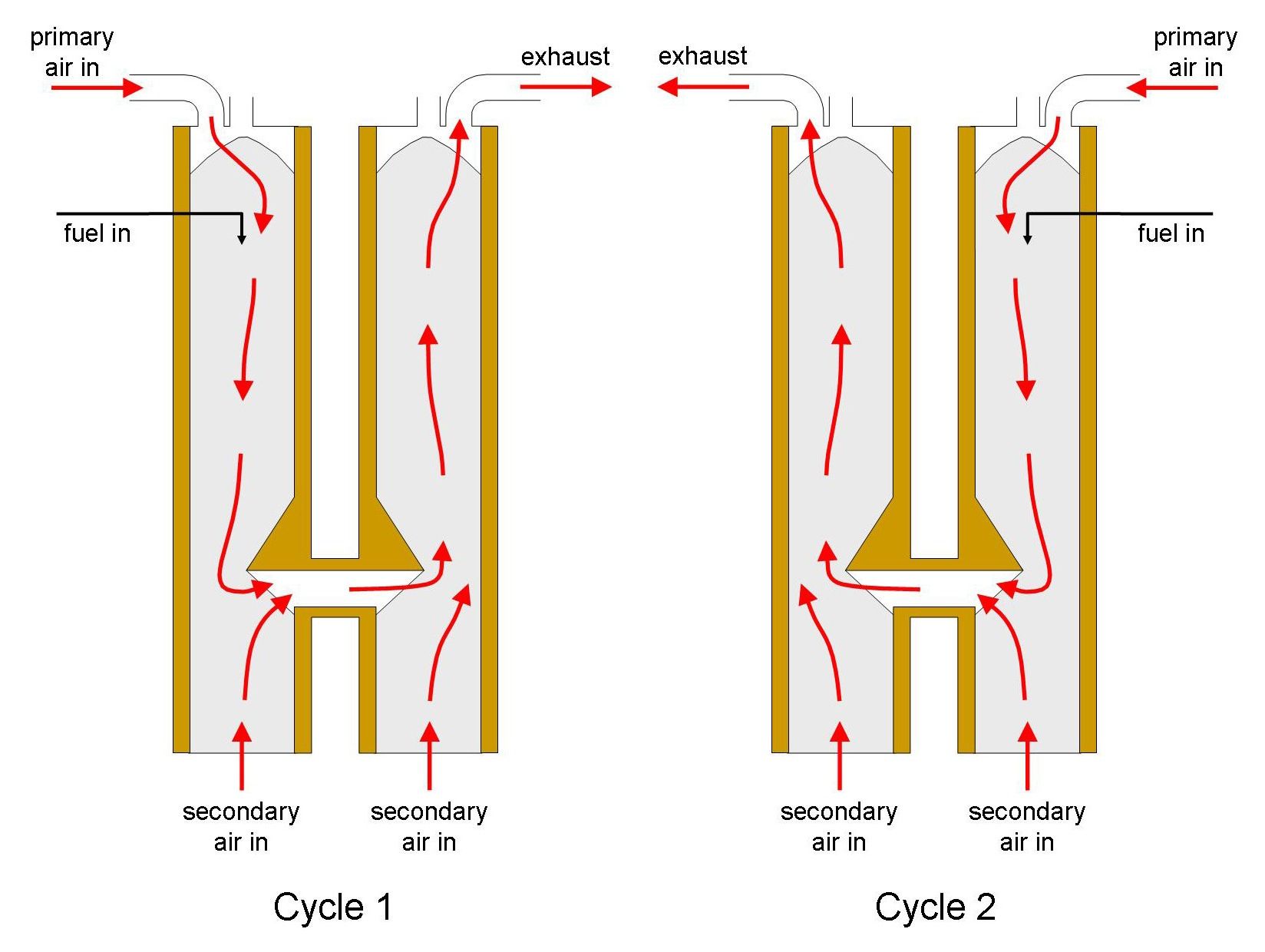
Gas flows in two cycles of operation of regenerative shaft kilns

=== Regenerative kilns ===
These typically consist of a pair of shafts, operated alternately. First, when shaft A is the "primary" and B the "secondary" shaft, the combustion air is added from the top of shaft A, while fuel somewhat below via burner lances. The flame is top-bottom. The hot gases pass downward, cross to shaft B via the so-called "channel" and pass upward to exhaust of shaft B. At same time in both shafts cooling air is added from the bottom to cool the lime and to make exhaust of gases via the bottom of the kiln impossible via maintaining a positive pressure. The combustion air and cooling air leave the kiln jointly via exhaust on top of shaft B, preheating the stone. The direction of flow is reversed periodically (typically 5–10 times per hour) shaft A and B changing the role of "primary" and "secondary" shaft. The kiln has three zones: preheating zone on the top, burning zone in the middle, and cooling zone close to the bottom. The cycling produces a long burning zone of constant, relatively low temperature (around 950 °C) that is ideal for the production of high quality soft burned reactive lime. With exhaust gas temperatures as low as 120 °C and lime temperature at kiln outlet in 80 °C range the heat loss of the regenerative kiln is minimal, fuel consumption is as low as 3.6 MJ/kg. Due to these features the regenerative kilns are today mainstream technology under conditions of substantial fuel costs. Regenerative kilns are built with 150 to 800 t/day output, 300 to 450 being typical.

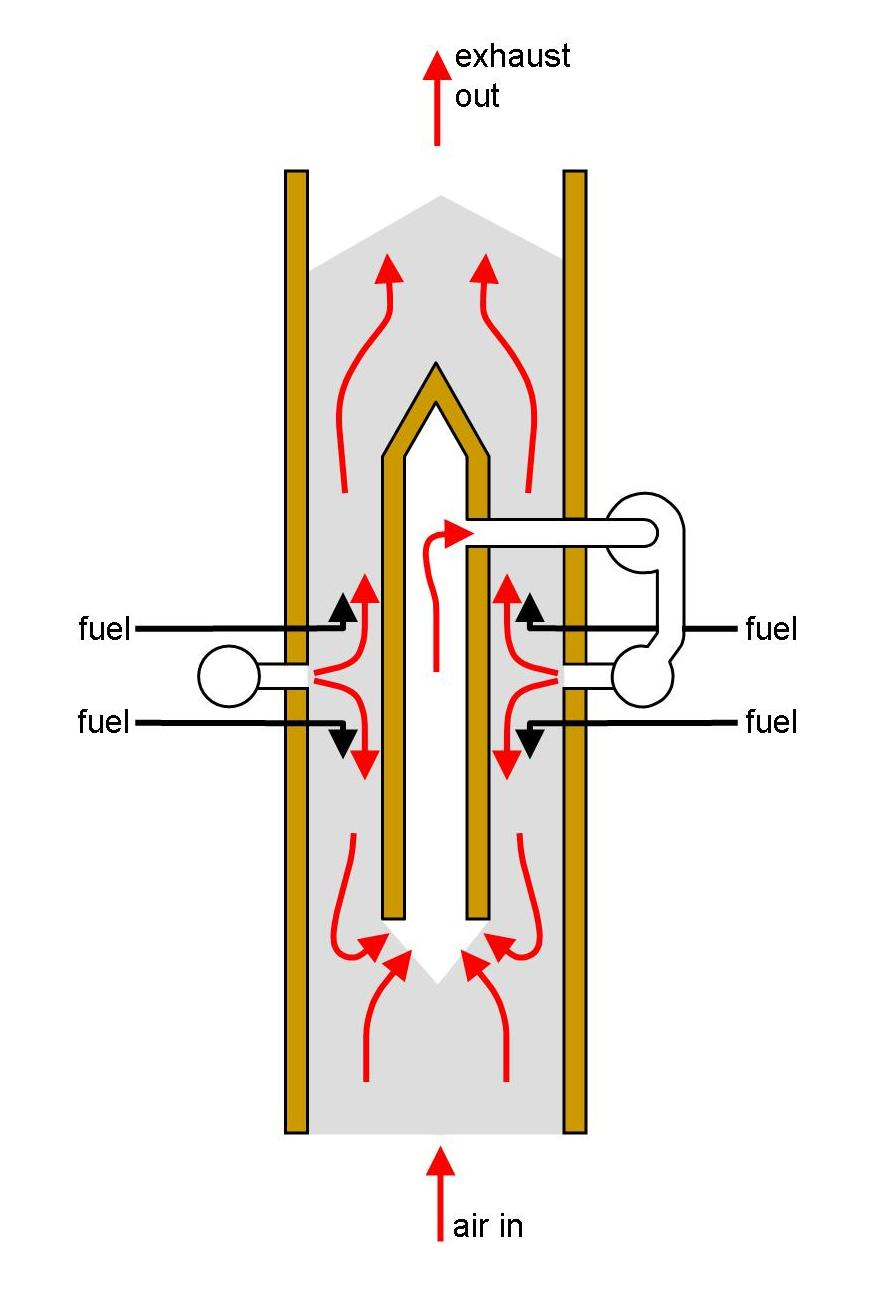
Gas flows in an annular shaft kiln

=== Annular kilns ===
These contain a concentric internal cylinder. This gathers pre-heated air from the cooling zone, which is then used to pressurize the middle annular zone of the kiln. Air spreading outward from the pressurized zone causes counter-current flow upwards, and co-current flow downwards. This again produces a long, relatively cool calcining zone. Fuel consumption is in 4 to 4.5 MJ/kg range and the lime is typically medium burned.

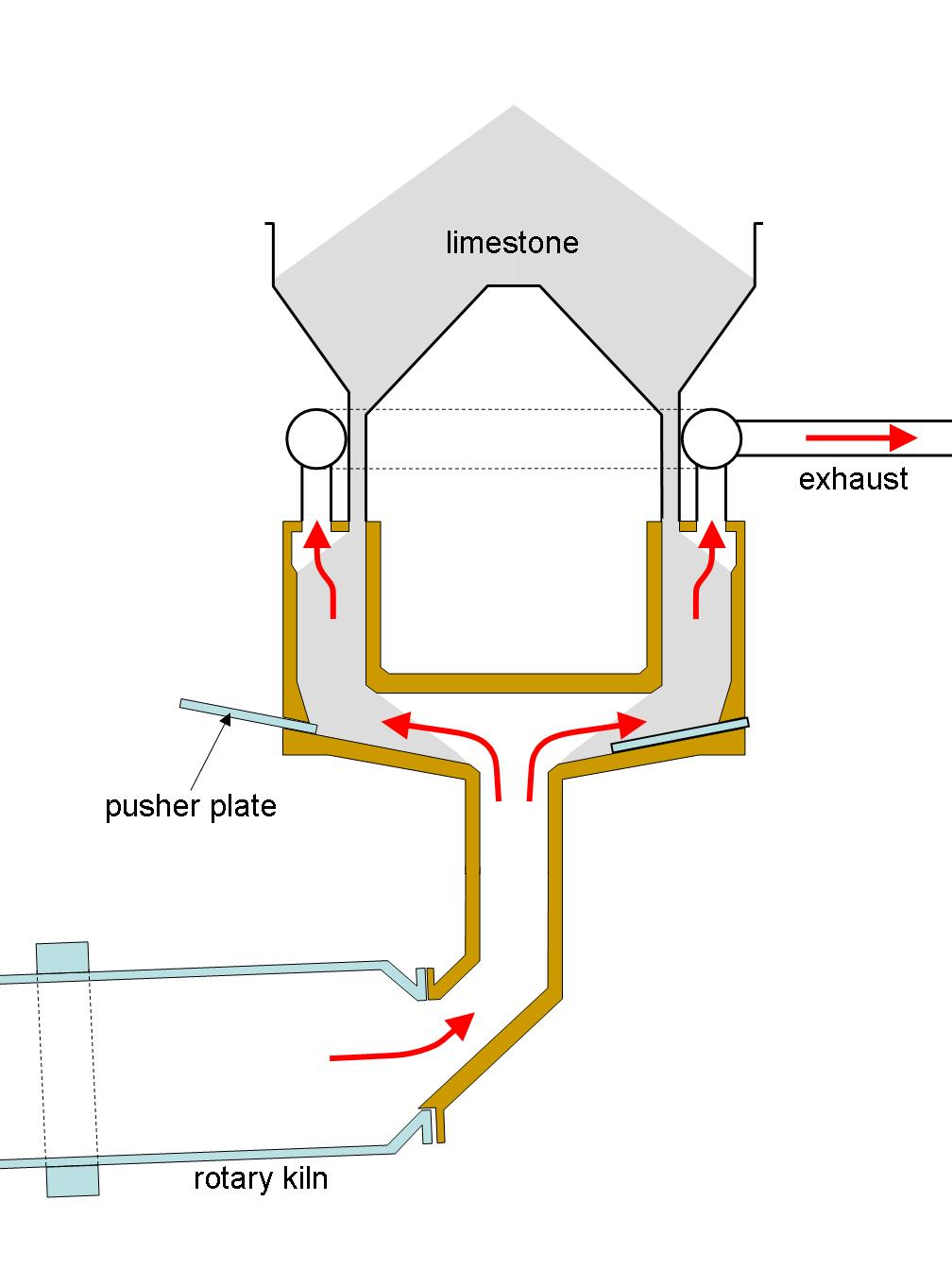
Rotary kiln with preheater: hot gas flows

=== Rotary kilns ===
Rotary kilns started to be used for lime manufacture at the start of the 20th century and now account for a large proportion of new installations if energy costs are less important. The early use of simple rotary kilns had the advantages that a much wider range of limestone size could be used, from fines upwards, and undesirable elements such as sulfur can be removed. On the other hand, fuel consumption was relatively high because of poor heat exchange compared with shaft kilns, leading to excessive heat loss in exhaust gases. Old fashioned "long" rotary kilns operate at 7 to 10 MJ/kg. Modern installations partially overcome this disadvantage by adding a preheater, which has the same good solids/gas contact as a shaft kiln, but fuel consumption is still somewhat higher, typically in range of 4.5 to 6 MJ/kg. In the design shown, a circle of shafts (typically 8–15) is arranged around the kiln riser duct. Hot limestone is discharged from the shafts in sequence, by the action of a hydraulic "pusher plate". Kilns of 1000 tonnes per day output are typical. The rotary kiln is the most flexible of any lime kilns able to produce soft, medium, or hard burned as well as dead-burned lime or dolime.

=== Gas cleaning ===
All the above kiln designs produce exhaust gas that carries an appreciable amount of dust. Lime dust is particularly corrosive. Equipment is installed to trap this dust, typically in the form of electrostatic precipitators or bag filters. The dust usually contains a high concentration of elements such as alkali metals, halogens and sulfur.

== Carbon dioxide emissions ==
The lime industry is a significant carbon dioxide emitter. The manufacture of one tonne of calcium oxide involves decomposing calcium carbonate, with the formation of 785 kg of CO_{2} in some applications, such as when used as mortar; this CO_{2} is later re-absorbed as the mortar goes off.

If the heat supplied to form the lime (3.75 MJ/kg in an efficient kiln) is obtained by burning fossil fuel it will release CO_{2}: in the case of coal fuel 295 kg/t; in the case of natural gas fuel 206 kg/t. The electric power consumption of an efficient plant is around 20 kWh per tonne of lime. This additional input is the equivalent of around 20 kg CO_{2} per ton if the electricity is coal-generated. Thus, total emission may be around 1 tonne of CO_{2} for every tonne of lime even in efficient industrial plants, but is typically 1.3 t/t. However, if the source of heat energy used in its manufacture is a fully renewable power source, such as solar, wind, hydro or even nuclear; there may be no net emission of CO_{2} from the calcination process. Less energy is required in production per weight than portland cement, primarily because a lower temperature is required.

== See also ==
- List of lime kilns
  - List of lime kilns in the United States
- Limepit
