= List of quarries =

This is a list of notable quarries, worldwide.

In Australia:

- Bombo Headland Quarry Geological Site
- Boogardie quarry
- Boya, Western Australia
- Cronulla sand dunes
- Moorooduc Quarry Flora and Fauna Reserve
- Mount Gibraltar Trachyte Quarries Complex
- Portland Cement Works Precinct
- Prospect Hill (New South Wales)
- Seaham Quarry
- Statham's Quarry

In Canada:

- Butchart Gardens
- Connolly's quarry
- Don Valley Brick Works
- French Fort Cove
- Hammerstone Project
- Mary's Point
- Miron Quarry
- Queenston
- Walcott Quarry

In Germany:

- Cotta Sandstone
- Elbe Sandstone
- Grillenburg Sandstone
- Hohburg Hills
- Klunst
- Königshain Hills
- Kriemhildenstuhl
- Mühlsteinbrüche
- Posta Sandstone
- Reinhardtsdorf Sandstone
- Waldenecksee
- Wunsiedel Marble

In Italy:

- Carrara, source of white marble including the block from which Michelangelo's David was carved

In Kosovo:

- Çikatovë e Vjeter
- Korroticë e Epërme

In Russia

- Ruskeala

In the United Kingdom

- See Category:Quarries in the United Kingdom

In the United States:

== See also ==
- List of lime kilns, many being near limestone quarries
