= Portland Cement Works Precinct =

Disused industrial site in Australia

- Location within New South Wales Location within Australia
- 33.3527°S 149.9825°E
- Location: Williwa Street, Portland, near City of Lithgow, New South Wales, Australia

History
- Built: 1890–2003

Site notes
- Architect: Various
- Owner: Boral Limited

New South Wales Heritage Register
- Official name: Portland Cement Works Precinct; Portland Cement Group; Commonwealth Portland Cement Company Ltd
- Type: State heritage (complex / group)
- Designated: 3 August 2012
- Reference no.: 1739
- Type: Historic Landscape
- Category: Landscape - Cultural
- Builders: Various

Portland Cement Works Precinct is a heritage-listed former cement works and limestone quarries and now disused industrial site at Williwa Street, Portland, City of Lithgow, New South Wales, Australia. It was designed and built in various stages from 1890 to 2003. It is also known as Portland Cement Group and Commonwealth Portland Cement Company Ltd. The property is owned by Boral Limited. It was added to the New South Wales State Heritage Register on 3 August 2012.

== History ==
=== Portland Cement Works Site - first phase (George Raffan) timeline ===
- 10,000 BC onwards – Known Aboriginal occupation of this region.
- 1820 – British explorer James Blackman was the first recorded white visitor to the region.
- 1824 – First land grants made.
- 1828 – MacPherson family took up a grant of 259 hectares (640 acres) and then another 259 hectares (640 acres) in 1832. The name Limestone Flat was associated with their property and they apparently used limestone found on their property in the building of their home (since demolished?).
- 1836/7 – William Lawson acquired the MacPherson family lands.
- 1863 – Thomas Murray was granted 24 hectares (60 acres) (bought from Lawson?), Portion 52 in the parish of Cullen Bullen, County of Roxburgh. He built two lime kilns on the property sometime after 1869.
- 1863 – Thomas Murray used site for lime production (and presumably extraction).
- 1882 – Thomas Murray sold Portion 52 to Charles Bate.
- 1882 – Alexander Currie and George Raffan became the owners of Portion 52 in August.
- 1883 – Railway line extended to nearby Capertee.
- 1884 – A one-roomed school was constructed at some distance from the site, known as the Cullen School.
- 1887 – Currie and Raffan with others formed the Cullen Bullen Lime & Marble Works, which bought Portion 52 in this year.
- 1889-1895 – The Cullen Bullen Lime & Marble Works had become the Cullen Bullen Lime & Cement Company by this date. The company produced cement under the brand name of "Kangaroo". The cement was of variable quality and only produced intermittently on site until production ceased in 1895. The only remnants of cement production from this era are the two bottle kilns in the north-west corner of Portion 52 and the old brick building known as "Raffan's Mill".
- 1894 – Village of Portland gazetted, to the south of the cement company's lease, with 200 people recorded as living in the area.
- 1895 – Cullen School was moved into the new village of Portland and expanded.
- 1895 – The Cullen Bullen Lime & Cement Company failed and was taken over by one of the original partners, George Raffan and his brother John, who opened the Ivanhoe Lime and Cement Works & Colliery.
- 1898 – The Ivanhoe Lime and Cement Works & Colliery also failed.
- 1899 – The name of the school was changed to Portland School.
- 1899 – The (British-owned) New Zealand Mines Trust through their agent Dr August Scheidel bought the land, plant and leases from the Raffan brothers. Scheidel, a metallurgist PhD with gold mining experience, obtained backing for an investment of A£100,000 to build a cement production plant, of which he remained Managing Director until 1918.

=== Portland Cement Works Site - second phase (Commonwealth Cement Works Site) timeline ===
- 1900 – A new company was formed in December, the Commonwealth Portland Cement Company (CPCC) under the guidance of Scheidel, soon installed as Managing Director. Most of the plant was demolished and new works begun, including the installation of a new German Cripps plant.
- 1901 – 284 men were recorded as working in a brick plant on the property as well as in construction. A railway line was begun to link the plant to its colliery and to the Portland siding.
- 1901 – The first application for a hotel licence in Portland.
- 1901 – The CPCC donated a block of land in the south west corner of Portion 52, on the main street of the new town, to the Anglican Church.
- 1902-1991 – The site was used as a highly successful, high quality lime quarrying and cement production works, reaching its maximum levels of production in 1928. In the first half of the century it specialised in the "Dry Process" but in the 1940s it switched over to the "Wet Process", again requiring decommissioning of much equipment and substantial renewal of the plant.
- 1902 – Production of cement was commenced on site under the name of "Union" brand. The logo of two clasped hands inside a circle was designed by Scheidel in 1901. Demand was soon found to exceed supply. There was an initial phase of expansion for the CPCC that was only curtailed by the commencement of World War I in 1914. Production capacity increased from 12 tonnes (13.5 short tons) in 1903 to 62 tonnes (68 short tons) in 1910.
- 1902 – The CPCC offered the Postal Department the use of one of their newly constructed cottages in Williwa Street to house an official post office and in 1903 extended the building to house the postal facilities.
- 1900s – Difficulties in recruiting labour to the cement plant meant that overseas workers were brought in, "adding a cosmopolitan note" to the isolated village. The workforce increased from 150 in 1903 to the 1911 figure of 608 employees (including some in the Sydney office) .
- 1904 – A new subdivision was laid out in the town.
- 1904 – First meeting of the United Labourers Protective Society, later the Railway Workers Union and then the Australian Workers Union. Scheidel noted that by 1908 that most of the plant's employees were members of the union.
- c. 1905 – Portland town band formed, with the CPCC supplying most of the uniforms and music, and it became known as the Commonwealth Portland Cement Company's Employees' Band. A grandstand was built for the band on company land in 1910. The local Rifle Club was also supplied with land donated from the company.
- 1906 – Portland was gazetted as a town.
- 1907 – NSW Governor Lord Northcote visited Portland cement works, followed soon afterwards by His Excellency Admiral Sir Harry Rawson.
- c. 1908 – An Accident Ward was opened on site to care for victims of accidents on site, and was also open to the general public. According to NBRS&P;, it was likely to have been initially sited in the Casino (2003, p27). The 1910 Annual Report noted that this facility had already saved two lives and alleviated much suffering. But it was expensive to run and Scheidel recommended the company help establish a town hospital.
- 1909 – A book entitled "To Commemorate the Seventh Congress of Chambers of Commerce of the British Empire held in Sydney, September 1909" stated that the cement produced by CPCC was "the favourite brand on the NSW market" which 'has also secured a considerable share of that of the other states, of New Zealand and of the South Sea Islands. Important public tenders have been secured with the Imperial and Federal Governments, the Public Works Department, the Railway commissioners of NSW, the Metropolitan Board of Water Supply and Sewerage, at Sydney, the Sydney Harbour Trust, the Sydney Municipal Council, the Railway commissioners of Queensland and Victoria, the Melbourne and Metropolitan Board of Works, the Hobart and Dunedin Drainage Boards and others... A large number of important structures have been, and are at present being built with the Company's cement [including] The Cataract Dam [and] the Burrenjuck Irrigation Scheme in NSW...' By 1912 the company was producing about 40% of Australia's Portland Cement.
- 1910 – The NSW Premier and the NSW Governor Lord Chelmsford with his wife Lady Chelmsford visited Portland on 11 May and workers were granted a public holiday for the day.
- 1910 – The CPCC began providing free electricity to light the main streets of Portland.
- 1910 – The police station was built (with help from the company?).
- 1911 – A visitor noted that the town was a bit shabby, with most of its retail buildings being relocated from nearby Sunny Corner, which had been shrinking with the end of its gold rushes. However, in this year the CPCC built five houses for its officers.
- 1912 – Nearly the e town turned out for the works picnic which was held on the company's recreation ground on the opposite side of Williwa Street, facing the Works site.
- 1912 – The foundation stone for a new town hospital was laid by Scheidel and the Portland District Hospital was officially opened 30 August 1913. The CPCC continued to support the hospital with coal and by encouraging employee fund-raising for occasional new pieces of expensive equipment. From 1924-1946 senior executives of the company provided expertise to the Hospital Board by taking on the roles of president, secretary or treasure.
- 1914-18 – WWI meant increased demand for cement because of the cessation of imports from Germany but also a reduction in the available workforce as men went off to war. The number of employees at the plant contracted from 634 in 1912 to 462 in 1917 and there were improved efficiencies. There was considerable increase in labour unrest during these years. It is interesting to note that Scheidel, though German, was not interned during WWI, as were other Germans in the company including the work's chemist. Notes from the company secretary... Indicate that a donation of A£5,000 was made to the war effort to keep Scheidel out of the main camp and allow him to be "interned" at Portland.
- 1915 – There was a one-month-long strike in the works. The first Works Picnic was held in April, in an attempt to improve labour relations.
- 1915 – The CPCC further donated land to the Anglican Church for a church hall and rectory.
- 1915 – The CPCC established an ambulance service for the town at a time when such a service was rare in the country.
- 1916 – Provided the cement for the reinforced concrete floors of the head office of the Commonwealth "Moneybox" building at 108-120 Pitt Street Sydney.
- 1917 – There was a general strike that forced the cement works to close down for two months. Scheidel described it as "the most dangerous and disastrous industrial upheaval yet experienced in this country". Scheidel was determined that "known troublemakers" were not to be re-employed when the works re-opened and the union saw this as victimisation. Although labour relations seem to have warmed after the retirement of Scheidel the following year, Annual Reports continued to note occasional strikes and mentioned the activities of "communist agitators".
- 1918 – Scheidel retired and was replaced as Managing Director by John Symonds. The war changed the previously good relations Germans had developed in Australia and as soon as the war was over Scheidel left Australia. Having travelled through Germany and much of Europe he settled in It6aly before returning to Frankfurt, Germany where he died in 1932
- 1923 – The CPCC Annual Report noted the shortage of housing in Portland and by 1925 had built 21 cottages for its employees.
- c. 1925 – A large new house was built for the Works Manager, John Saville, who held this position from 1903 to 1938.
- 1926 – The former residence of the Works Manager was transformed into a boarding house by the company. This house was designated for the use of single teachers in the local school 1932-1950, when it was known as "Harmony Hall". It was eventually demolished.
- 1920s – After war efficiencies and labour unrest, the 1920s saw increased mechanisation of the plant and a second phase great expansion of the works with new, more efficient combination mills being added to the raw and cement mill operations and no. 8 Rotary Mill operating from 1924. The company continued to prosper even in the face of increased competition arising from the establishment of three new cement companies in NSW (on top of the already established and fiercely competitive Kandos Cement Ltd).
- 1928-34 – Great Depression forced a downsizing of output and workforce. Major maintenance works were undertaken on the plant and works. Up to 80% of employees lost their jobs and many took to fossicking for gold in the hills nearby (a region gold rush during the nineteenth century). The company waived rent for those still living in company housing in 1932.
- 1931-32 – The works supplied much of the cement used in a day labour project to seal the main streets on the town in concrete.
- 1938 – only 411 men employed in the plant produced much the same output as the 611 men employed in 1929, as a result of mechanisation and increased efficiencies.
- 1939-45 – World War II saw the Commonwealth Government resume a small block of land in Portion 52 fronting Williwa St to build a "Munitions Annex" for workers in the production of munitions.
- Late 1940s – The company changed hands to Associated Portland Cement Manufacturers U.K. (APCM). A decision was made to change form "dry process" to "wet process" and the old plant was decommissioned or refitted and a new No. 1 Rotary kiln installed in 1951.
- 1948 – Town seems to have reached its peak population: 3125.
- c. 1956 – Industrial unrest in Portland focused around the "Butcher Girl Strike" defending young woman ill-treated by butcher employer
- 1958 – The Portland & District Olympic Pool was built mostly by voluntary labour on land leased by the company to the city, the former site of "Harmony Hall" opposite the works. The company also provided materials and general assistance.
- 1959 – Production capacity of the Works was 226,796 tonnes (250,000 short tons) of cement and 18,144 tonnes (20,000 short tons) of lime.
- 1960s – A new product was developed which was to become the most significant in the Portland Cement range, ultimately marketed under the trade name, "Off White". However the cement market in Australia was reducing and although this product increased in sales the overall output of cement from the company dropped from 226,796 tonnes (250,000 short tons) per annum in 1974 to 145,150 tonnes (160,000 short tons) in 1979 and 79,832 tonnes (88,000 short tons) in 1983.
- 1974 – APCM merged with BHP and formed Blue Circle Southern Cement Ltd. This company also owned cement works at Maldon (near Picton), Charbon and later Berrima.
- 1981 – Population: 2194.
- 1991 – The operating plant was old and getting less efficient and the production of cement ceased in November although the limestone quarries remained open, and some crushing equipment, for supplying the cement works at Maldon.
- 1992 – Blue Circle Southern Cement taken over by Boral.
- 1993 – Heritage assessment report focusing on the industrial archaeological values of the site was commissioned by Blue Circle Cement and completed by Peter Fenwick and Kate Holmes.
- 1998 – Boral closed down the limestone quarries and began dismantling the plant and rehabilitating the landscape in preparation for sale. Much of the cement works equipment has been taken off the site.
- 2003 – Heritage assessment report focusing on the future of the worker's cottages along Williwa Street but also appraising the site generally was commissioned by prospective buyer Lloyd Monck and completed by Colin Israel of Noel Bell Ridley Smith & Partners.

=== 1890-1992 Williwa Street cottages timeline ===
- c. 1890 – First set of workers' accommodation built along Williwa Road, being the old Bachelors' Quarters (No. 3 & 4 Williwa Street) and No. 7 & 8 Williwa Street. They are built during the Cullen Bullen Lime and Cement Company operations, as simple three-room single-storey terrace cottages. The Bachelors' Quarters are constructed as four three-room apartments with shared amenities at the rear.
- 1900-01 – A Post Office building is constructed. Originally built to accommodate staff, the building is offered to the Postal Department in 1902 as the district Post Office, a role it plays until 1912.
- 1900-02 – Four semi-detached single-storey cottages are built along Williwa Street (5 & 6, 9 & 10, 11 & 12, 13 & 14 Williwa Street). Each is built as four room dwellings; two bedrooms, a living room and a kitchen.
- 1901 – The Casino (Officers' Mess) is constructed facing Williwa Street, closest to the cement works. Built under Scheidel's instructions to be used by the company's unmarried officers and mechanics for their meals and social gatherings. It consists of two rooms; one for meals and one as a reading room.
- c. 1908 – The Casino (Officers' Mess) is converted into an accident ward, that is also made available to the general public.
- 1912 – A new post office building is constructed in Portland. The old post office in Williwa Street is converted for use by the Bank of New South Wales, with the attached dwelling becoming the bank manager's residence. The bank remains in the building until 1964.
- 1912 – Accident ward deals with at least 30 typhoid patients during an epidemic in Portland.
- c. 1920 – Alterations to the old Bachelors' Quarters includes the addition of a laundry and bathroom at the rear of each apartment.
- c. 1930s – Old Bachelors' Quarters is opened up to form two x two bedroom apartments.
- 1943 – Land adjoining the Casino is taken up by the Commonwealth Government for construction of a fire arms annex connected to the Small Arms Factory in Lithgow. The annex is one of ten buildings in the district constructed to supply rifle and machine gun components to the Lithgow factory.
- 1964 – The Bank of NSW relocates to a new bank building in Portland and the former Post Office building is converted back to accommodation for the cement works.
- 1974 – Portland Cement buys back the former small arms annex building and uses it for on-site storage.
- 1992 – The cottages begin to be vacated as the cement works begin to close. All cottages are currently empty.

Aboriginal people and colonisation

Aboriginal occupation of the Blue Mountains area dates back at least 12,000 years and appears to have intensified some 3000–4000 years ago. In pre-colonial times the region around Portland was inhabited by Aboriginal people of the Wiradjuri linguistic group. European settlement in this region after the first documented white expedition west of the Blue Mountains in 1813 was tentative, largely because of concerns about resistance from Aboriginal people. There was contact, evidenced by sporadic hostility and by the quantity of surviving artefacts manufactured by the Aboriginal people from European glass. By 1840 there was widespread dislocation of Aboriginal culture, aggravated after 1850 by the goldrush to the region.

Jack Reed, a long-time resident of Portland, recalls how, as a child in the 1930s, he used to go hunting with two Aboriginal men named Jack and Jimmy. He estimated their birthdates as c. 1890 and their visits to Portland as quite frequent. As part of the day these men would visit rock engravings (since removed) but never allow Jack to go near them. Neither spoke much English and both hunted with spears and boomerangs. While staying at Portland they camped close to the dam near the Portland Golf Course. Jack also remembers occasional groups of Aboriginal people coming to Portland to hold corroborees for the town's people.

The National Parks & wildlife Service register lists 19 Aboriginal sites in the immediate area of Portland, typically rock shelters or expanses of rock with archaeological deposits and sometimes with art and / or axe-grinding grooves, open sites with scatters of stone artefacts and carved trees. In 1982 two sites containing scatterings of stone artefacts were discovered in East Portland during an archaeological survey of the Ivanhoe Colliery for Blue Circle Southern Cement Ltd but these sites were not conserved for various reasons. There have been no Aboriginal sites associated with the Portland Cement Works and Quarries Site.

=== Portland and cement manufacture in Australia (draft) ===
Until the early 19th century, lime was the major ingredient used in mortar, which was central to western construction techniques for holding bricks and other building materials in place. In 1824 "Portland Cement" was developed in England by Joseph Aspdin, who named it after a pale grey coloured rock associated with Portland, England. Portland Cement is made by mixing limestone or chalk with either clay or shale in the right proportions and burning the mixture at 1,400-1,500 degrees Celsius, a point where the mix begins to fuse. The resulting clinker is then ground fine to produce cement. The first large cement works were built in Britain in 1843. Portland Cement was a far superior building product and it caught on quickly in Europe and especially Germany but was infrequently used in Australia before the end of the 19th century.

The first recorded manufacture of Portland Cement in Australia was at Tasmania's Maria Island Company, which showed cement samples at the Melbourne Centennial Exhibition in 1888. In Victoria David Mitchell was making cement from before 1890 until his death 1916 in Melbourne, although in fairly small quantities. The Portland Cement Co Ltd began production in Fyansford in Victoria in 1890. There is a reference in Australia that locates the earliest experiments with Portland Cement at the Portland site in NSW in 1884 by the Cullen Bullen Lime & Cement Company. However this company was not actually in existence until 1889, although one of its owners, George Raffan, had bought the site in 1882 and the reference may be to his preliminary activities in developing cement manufacture. His Cullen Bullen Lime & Cement Company was the first firm in NSW to successfully manufacture Portland Cement - under the brand name "Kangaroo" - but the firm was unable to make it at a sufficiently high and even standard to be commercially viable, and its production ceased in 1895. George Raffan reopened the business with his brother John in 1896 as the Ivanhoe Lime and Cement Works & Colliery but this too had failed by 1898. These first cement plants on the Portland site used eight static charge (bottle-shaped) kilns with millstone grinding, powered by a small steam plant. Two of these early bottle kilns - built of brick with iron ties and turnbuckles- and the milling plant in the north west corner of Portion 52 stand as historical monuments to the beginning of the cement industry in NSW.

In 1899 the British-owned New Zealand Mines Trust paid A£38,000 for the Portland leases and plant at the instigation of Dr August Scheidel, then Consul-General for the Austro-Hungarian Empire in Sydney (the 40-hectare (100-acre) site at Portland was purchased soon afterwards, in 1902). Scheidel, who "is considered the father of the modern cement industry in Australia", was born in Heidelberg and had received his PhD from Freiberg University in 1880. The Commonwealth Portland Cement Company (CPCC) was established to run the business in December 1900 - just days before Federation - and was possibly the first company in Australia to use the word "Commonwealth" in its name. 'The cost of initial plant machinery and buildings came to over 150,000 pounds and during the next ten years a further A£100,000 would be spent on the plant's expansion'. Under the guidance of Scheidel as Managing Director, and with this large injection of capital spending and foreign expertise, the Portland Cement Works Site became one of Australia's largest and longest-running cement manufacturing plants.

The only other early cement manufacturer in NSW was Goodlett & Smith, established c. 1891 and located in Granville Sydney from 1901. The CPCC had an "agreement" with Goodlett & Smith, but this "friendly" relationship was transformed into one of intense competition after Goodlett & Smith sold out to the NSW Cement Lime & Coal Co in 1918 (first registered in 1913 and in production from 1916) which was re-organised and renamed in 1920 as Kandos Cement Ltd, based in Kandos, near Portland. In addition, three new cement companies were established in NSW during the twenties: the Sulphide Corporation near Newcastle in 1925; Standard at Charbon, also near Portland in 1926; and Southern at Berrima in 1929. In addition, the Victorian-based Portland Cement Co Ltd changed name to Australian Portland Cement in 1905 and had become an aggressive competitor in the cement market by the 1920s. For the first time supply outstripped demand and when the Great Depression hit in the late 1920s, demand for cement plummeted. The impact on the CPCC was at first ameliorated by government works projects to pave roads in cement and to stabilise rivers with cement canals but soon these projects also became scarce. CPCC sales of cement fell from a high of 130,456 tonnes (143,803 short tons) in 1927 out of a total of 395,358 tonnes (435,808 short tons) sold in NSW that year, to a low of 137,892 tonnes (152,000 short tons) in sales for the entire State in 1931...

=== The role of the cement works in the history of Portland ===
The development of the township of Portland and its cement works have been closely entwined. The Portland region was earlier known as "Limestone Flat" but was gazetted as the village of Portland in 1894, just five years after Portland Cement was first manufactured in NSW on this site. Thus the town was undoubtedly named after the product, rather than the other way round (indeed, it was one of about ten towns worldwide that received their name from the manufacture of Portland Cement).

'The town of Portland and the Works were almost synonymous. As the Works grew and prospered the town grew and prospered with the CPCC assisting in the establishment of much of the town's infrastructure. Scheidel was a pioneer in public relations and is quoted in the 1909 Annual Report as saying "it is to the advantage of the Company to make life in Portland more and more enjoyable".

'The Works were almost totally self-sufficient. Water for the site was piped from company built dams on the site, the Colliery supplied all the fuel requirements of the kilns and power house, electricity was generated, sufficient to supply both the Works and the town, limestone and shale quarries were almost adjacent to the plant and the company built a railway line to connect the Works to the main railway and operated its own locomotives'.

'For most employees, staying in Portland meant working at the cement factory. Two and even three generations of the same family worked there'. Some commentators noted a close and warm association between the company and the township, while others were less optimistic: "When some long-time employees were asked about the company as an employer, the initial reaction was silence, and then the reply, that there was little choice".

The closure of the works in 1991 had an impact on the town of Portland and the economy of the region but alternative employment opportunities had begun to arise, principally at the Wallerawang and Mount Piper Power Stations, and the town seems to have survived. It is, no doubt, a cleaner and quieter place without the operation of a cement work almost in its centre.

=== Comparative analysis of Portland with other single-industry towns in NSW ===
Portland is unusual in NSW for its homogeneity as a one-industry, indeed one-company town (even if that company did change hands several times over the century). Other examples of single industry towns in NSW are: Port Kembla, which is closely identified with the steel industry and BHP but is more diverse than Portland because of its closeness to the city of Wollongong; Cobar, associated with copper, but with a variety of companies involved; Burraga, south west of Oberon, another copper region but with looser ties than Portland between the industry and the township...

== Description ==
The Portland Cement Works & Quarries Site is a large historical industrial site set in the centre of the town of Portland, some 27 km north west of Lithgow, just west of the Blue Mountains. The cement works closed down in 1991 and the last lime quarry was decommissioned in 1998. About 30 titles of land can be found within the area examined by the 1993 industrial archaeological study of the site by Fenwick & Holmes - of this about half the site is now owned by Boral and the other half is Crown land leased by Boral, however Boral has a closure plan in place.

The cement works originally occupied a large area of Lots 52 and 53 Volume 5461 Folio 163. However, the removal of much of the physical fabric of the cement works following its closure, and the rehabilitation and inundation of the quarry sites has reduced the curtilage of the works to only include the main Processing and Administrative Precinct that was decommissioned in 1995. Evidence of the nineteenth century phase of the use of the site is separately listed as Raffans Mill and Brick Bottle Kilns.

The key elements of the twentieth century phase are:

- the Powerhouse;
- the Chimney or Boiler Stack;
- the Ambulance Station or oil store, 1902;
- the Blacksmiths Workshop c. 1902;
- Electricians Store or Dining Room;
- the Fitters Workshop;
- the Administration Building c. 1902;
- the locker/shower room;
- the rectangular cement silo or No. 2 Cement Silo, c. 1920 (No. 2 Silos); [May need to be demolished because structurally unsound]
- the eight cylindrical cement silos;
- the Railway Loading Shed and Locomotive (or Engine or Loco) Shed, East and West; [May need to be demolished because structurally unsound]
- the Crusher Building c. 1970s;
- Residential buildings including: workers' cottages built by the Cullen Bullen Lime Cement Company during the 1890s (nos 3, 4, 7 & 8 Williwa Street); workers' cottages built by the Commonwealth Portland Cement Company after 1901 (nos 1, 2, 5, 6, 9-14 Williwa Street)
- "Casino" or officer's recreation rooms c. 1901.
- Ammunitions (or Fire Arms) Annex, 1943. [May need to be demolished because economically unfeasible for adaptive re-use].

Four former lime quarries, which are sited nearby within the Fenwick & Holmes study area, now have stepped back walls and filled with water, and surrounded by rehabilitation plantings to minimise their danger. Quarries 1, 2 and 4 are all about 70 metres deep while Quarry 3 is about 15 metres (49 ft) deep and was used to retain drainage for the town.

The cement plant buildings including the Powerhouse were constructed largely of materials obtained on the site including clay for bricks. The Powerhouse's iron girders were imported from England from the same manufacturer as supplied the Eveleigh Street Railway Yards.

=== Buildings considered to have structural problems ===
Fenwick & Holmes (1993, 63) have recommended that "every effort should be made to retain" the rectangular Cement Storage Silo (a brick building with gable ends and a galvanised tin roof, some 50m x 13m in dimension, and that forms part of the row of plant buildings to the east of the Powerhouse). However this building is argued by Noel Bell Ridley Smith to have major structural problems along with the Railway Loading Shed and the Locomotive (or Engine or Loco) Shed. Godden Mackay Logan agrees with NBRS that the rectangular cement silo is structurally unsound. However heritage engineer Peter Benkendorff is of the opinion that the building is or great heritage interest and is fundamentally sound and should be retained.

NBRS identified the workers cottages at Nos 3 and 4 Williwa Street to have severe structural damage requiring their demolition.

=== Moveable heritage - museum collection ===
There is a further important element that is currently off-site and not included in this listing but may constitute an important issue associated with the conservation of the site: the many items of moveable heritage discarded from the site over the years that have been amassed in a substantial collection stored off-site by former employee Charlie Pinch, and that have been dedicated to the people of Portland. The SHR listing will support future applications for funding to conserve, catalogue and exhibit this collection.

=== Condition ===
As at 5 May 2005, the Portland Cement Plant Processing and Administrative Precinct buildings, works and infrastructure range from being in good condition to poor, even dangerous, conditions. The main series of buildings, including the Powerhouse, Chimney, Administration Building and Locker/Shower Room, are all in good condition. The site has some archaeological potential to show locations, footings and remains of the earlier stages of the cement-making process on the site.

The Processing and Administrative Precinct of the Portland Cement Works has been significantly dismantled but retains many significant elements. Although the site has ceased to operate as a cement works, the spatial aspect of the remaining buildings, including their frontage to Williwa Street, the T-shaped layout of the works and the remnant rail tracks all combine to provide information on the operation of the site and the scale of the original works. The proximity of the works to the town of Portland and the location of the municipal pool across the road from the main entrance serve to act as links between the works and the town itself. The remaining chimney also acts as a landmark feature for the town and district.

=== Modifications and dates ===
The Portland Cement Works has undergone a series of modifications and updates during its operational history. A number of the buildings remaining within the Processing and Administrative Precinct date from the 1902 phase of development, when Scheidel built his new plant. Buildings from this phase include the Powerhouse, Locomotive Shed, Administration Building, blacksmith's workshops and ambulance station. The Powerhouse was originally built as two separate buildings, but joined by 1910. The southern end of the building was also extended around the same time. Also at this time, the overhead gantry crane was extended through the entire Powerhouse. A number of changes were made internally over the operation period of the Powerhouse to support new machinery. The other buildings within this precinct underwent little change during their operation. The last major change was after 1991, when the plant was gradually closed down. Much of the operating machinery was removed to other sites. The main mill buildings were removed before 2003.

== Heritage listing ==
As at 17 May 2005, the Portland Cement Works Site is of State significance as the remnants of a cultural landscape that evidences the history of one of Australia's most successful lime quarrying and cement manufacture enterprises - an enterprise which generated a product crucial to the construction of many important structures in NSW throughout the twentieth century. Between 1900 and 1995 the site provided both raw materials from its own quarries and a place for the long-term, large-scale production of world-quality cement, using a succession of both local and imported machinery and labour. This industrial site led to the establishment and naming of the town of Portland and has contributed to its civic and social development since the late nineteenth century. This relationship between industry and local population is of State significance because of its rarity within NSW as a long-term, single-industry, one-company town, and because the relationship is evident in the layout of the town and in many of its civic amenities (from workers cottages and concrete roads to the municipal swimming pool). While the (former) Portland Cement Works Site is of local significance as "the heart of Portland", it is of State significance for begetting "the town that built NSW". See also Raffan's Mill and Brick Bottle Kiln - related listing.

Portland Cement Works Precinct was listed on the New South Wales State Heritage Register on 3 August 2012 having satisfied the following criteria.

The place is important in demonstrating the course, or pattern, of cultural or natural history in New South Wales.

The Portland Cement Works Site is of State significance as the site of one of Australia's most successful, long-term lime quarrying and cement manufacture enterprises, which generated a product crucial to the construction of many important structures in NSW throughout the twentieth century. Between 1900 and 1995 the site provided both raw materials from its own quarries and a place for the long-term large-scale production of world-quality cement, using a succession of both local and imported machinery and labour. The cement manufacturing plant developed by Dr Scheidel on the site at the turn of the twentieth century is of historical significance for having incorporated international technology such as the coal-fired rotary kilns, which were just being developed in Germany. When installed in 1902 Portland was then at the leading edge of cement manufacturing technology in the world. This industrial site led to the establishment and naming of the town of Portland and has contributed to its civic and social development since the late nineteenth century. This relationship between industry and local population is of State significance because of its rarity within NSW as a long-term, single-industry, one-company town. The company's significant role in the development of the town is evident in a number of civic projects and amenities in Portland including the workers' cottages included in the curtilage, the Municipal Pool, the Anglican Church site and concreted roads. The (former) Portland Cement Works and Quarries Site may be of local significance as "the heart of Portland", but is of State significance for begetting "the town that built NSW".

The place has a strong or special association with a person, or group of persons, of importance of cultural or natural history of New South Wales's history.

The Portland Cement Works Site is of State significance for its association with Dr August Scheidel, a metallurgist PhD, who has been described as the father of the modern cement industry in Australia. Scheidel obtained the capital to rebuild the cement works at Portland and, under his direction, make it one of Australia's most successful cement producing plants prior to WW II. As Managing Director he combined the expertise of building, mining and engineering professionals with the then recently developed German tunnel kilns to establish an efficient manufacturing plant for Portland. The site also has associations with local pioneers in the cement manufacturing industry, such as John Symonds and John Saville, as well as with the NSW Governor Lord Chelmsford, who visited Portland in 1913, apparently in honour of the site's contribution to NSW's building industry.

The place is important in demonstrating aesthetic characteristics and/or a high degree of creative or technical achievement in New South Wales.

The remnant industrial buildings on the Portland Cement Works Site are of State significance as a complex of industrial buildings from throughout the twentieth century. The group includes representative examples of Federation and Inter War period industrial buildings and buildings constructed in brickwork with fine steel trusses and which demonstrate the quality of workmanship and functional design applied to large-scale industrial engineering projects. The smaller scale Victorian / Federation period buildings have aesthetic significance as vernacular company buildings of several types and scales demonstrating the symbiotic relationship of a large industrial company to its host town. The Williwa Street cottages are of State significance as representative Federation era cottages that help demonstrate the social stratification of the company town. The site contains many industrial remnants from its long and varied history of cement manufacture that add to the technical significance of its heritage. The Powerhouse chimney is a local landmark within the town of Portland.

The place has a strong or special association with a particular community or cultural group in New South Wales for social, cultural or spiritual reasons.

The Portland Cement Works Site is of State significance for the social significance of the unusually close relationship it represents between the company and the township. It is also of local social significance to the people of Portland for whom the works were central to their everyday lives in financial, environmental, social and civic interrelationships. The site remains of significance to those whose family members and friends were killed and injured in the often dangerous operations of quarrying and cement manufacture. The dimensions of this social significance would be well examined in a substantial program of oral history research.

The place has potential to yield information that will contribute to an understanding of the cultural or natural history of New South Wales.

The Portland Cement Works Site is of State significance for its research potential associated with its rare industrial archaeological features and for its surviving documentation relating to the production of cement in a highly successful, large-scale and continually evolving enterprise which lasted over a century.

The place possesses uncommon, rare or endangered aspects of the cultural or natural history of New South Wales.

The relationship between industry and local population in the Portland Cement Works Site is of State significance because of its rarity within NSW as a long-term, single-industry, one-company town. The site is an outstanding example of an industrial enterprise interrelated with the genesis and development of a rural town, to the extent that the town itself was named after the company's most successful product, and many of its civic amenities were provided by the company (from church site and electricity to cement roads and municipal pool) while the town of course supplied the labour crucial to the company's long-term successful operation.

The place is important in demonstrating the principal characteristics of a class of cultural or natural places/environments in New South Wales.

Even in its partially dismantled state, the Portland Cement Works Site is of State significance as a fine example of its type displaying many of the principal characteristics of a cement manufacturing plant. The Williwa Street cottages are of significance as representative Federation period cottages that demonstrate the social stratification of this company town in the early twentieth century.

== See also ==
- Raffan's Mill and Brick Bottle Kilns
