= Ben Bullen railway station =

Railway station in New South Wales, Australia

Ben Bullen
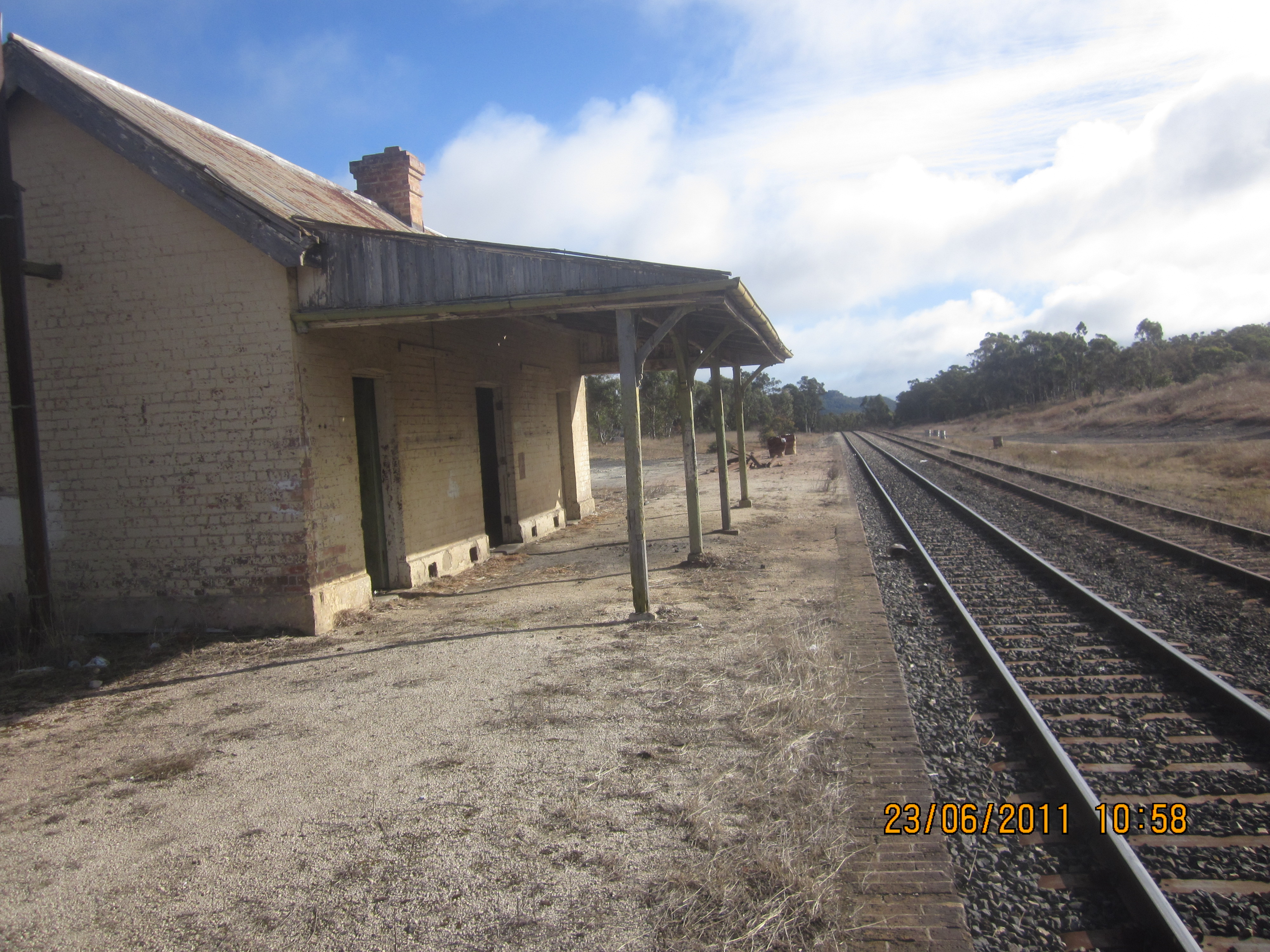
- Ben Bullen railway station, 2011

General information
- Location: Wallerawang-Gwabegar railway line, Ben Bullen, City of Lithgow, New South Wales; Australia
- Coordinates: 33°13′06″S 150°01′19″E
- Owner: Transport Asset Holding Entity
- Line: Gwabegar
- Distance: 200 km (120 mi) from Central
- Platforms: 1 side
- Tracks: 2

History
- Opened: 1882
- Closed: 1974

Services
Preceding station	Former services	Following station
Cullen Bullen towards Gwabegar	Gwabegar Line	Capertee towards Wallerawang

New South Wales Heritage Register
- Official name: Ben Bullen Railway Station group
- Type: State heritage (complex / group)
- Designated: 2 April 1999
- Reference no.: 1082
- Type: Railway Platform/ Station
- Category: Transport - Rail
Location

The Ben Bullen railway station is a heritage-listed former railway station on the Wallerawang–Gwabegar railway line at Ben Bullen, in the Central West region of New South Wales, Australia. It is also known as Ben Bullen Railway Station group. The property was added to the New South Wales State Heritage Register on 2 April 1999.

== History ==
The station opened on 15 May 1882 and closed on 1 June 1974.

== Description ==
The complex comprises a type 4 standard roadside station building, brick (small), erected in 1882; and a brick platform face, also erected in the same year; and a signal frame - (SU+L).

== Heritage listing ==
Ben Bullen railway station was listed on the New South Wales State Heritage Register on 2 April 1999 having satisfied the following criteria.

The place possesses uncommon, rare or endangered aspects of the cultural or natural history of New South Wales.

This item is assessed as historically rare. This item is assessed as arch. rare. This item is assessed as socially rare.
