= Portland, New South Wales =

Portland
- Town
- Interactive map of Portland
- Coordinates: 33°21′16″S 149°58′58″E
- Country: Australia
- State: New South Wales
- LGA: City of Lithgow
- Location: 26 km (16 mi) NW of Lithgow; 48 km (30 mi) ENE of Bathurst, New South Wales; 30 km (19 mi) S of Capertee

Government
  - State electorate: Bathurst
  - Federal division: Calare
- Elevation: 925 m (3,035 ft)

Population
  - Total: 2,424 (2016 census)
- Postcode: 2847
Localities around Portland
		Cullen Bullen
	Portland	Blackmans Flat
Sunny Corner	Mount Lambie

Portland is a town in the Central Tablelands of New South Wales, Australia. At the 2016 census, Portland had a population of 2,424 people. The town was named after Australia's first cement works.

== Location ==
Portland is part of the gateway to the Central West and is located between Oberon, Mudgee, Bathurst, Lithgow, and the Blue Mountains. It is a short drive from both the Great Western and Castlereagh Highways. It is accessed from the Great Western Highway via Wallerawang or from Sunny Corner Rd at Meadow Flat. It is accessed from the Castlereagh Highway via Boulder Road at the Mt Piper Power Station.

The town centre has a distinct business district, several parks and sporting clubs.

== History ==
Prior to European settlement, the Portland region was occupied by the Wiradjuri people. The first European in the area was James Blackman who surveyed roads in the area in 1820 and today Blackman's Flat and Blackman's Crown bear the family name.

The town of Portland is of interest as an historic mining town, and also as the place of the first cement factory in Australia. In 1863, Thomas Murray selected 61 hectares of land and constructed his first lime kiln on what is now the corner of Lime and Villiers Streets. The railway came through Portland in 1882 and the first station opened in 1887 was called Cullen Siding until 1889. The Cullen Bullen Lime and Cement Company established operations in the village that year. During the early 1890s, the first cement-making kilns west of the Blue Mountains were built in Portland.

In 1894, the village was gazetted as Portland, the name derived from the cement-making process which was already well underway in the area.

The cement works opened in 1902 and Portland was declared a town in 1906. Many of the original buildings in Portland were built by the cement works company for employees and still stand. Well-known Australian brand names now adorn many of the historic shops and buildings, creating a strong link to "yesteryear" that is celebrated by the town.

== Heritage listings ==
Portland has a number of heritage-listed sites, including:

- Carlton Road: Raffan's Mill and Brick Bottle Kilns
- Williwa Street: Portland Cement Works Precinct

== The cement works ==
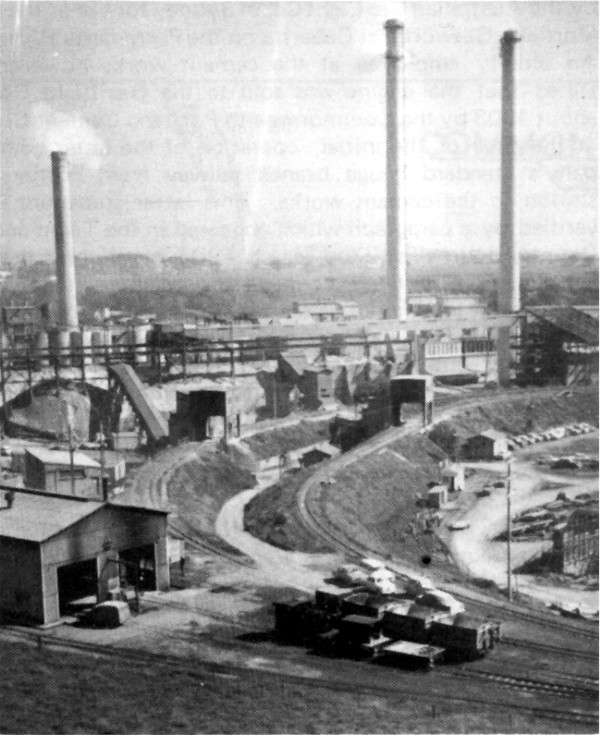
Commonwealth Portland Cement Works, c. 1950.

From 1902, cement produced at the "Commonwealth Portland Cement Company" mill helped build up the cities of Sydney, Melbourne, and Canberra. "Portland cement", a phrase synonymous with high quality cement anywhere in the world, was milled using limestone from onsite quarries and shipped throughout Australia. The town of Portland grew up around the Cement Works and the company contributed greatly to the area, building facilities that were needed for employees. A bath house, casino, an ice skating rink, Olympic swimming pool, and living quarters were supplied to workers. The cement kilns even generated enough energy to power the homes around it.

The factories of Portland and the surrounding area required the transportation of limestone, coal, and other materials, and to this end, a number of private industrial railways and tramways were constructed.

== Climate ==
At an altitude of 925 metres above sea level, Portland is the 21st highest town in Australia and classified as a temperate zone. Cool winters and warm summers ensure four distinct seasons and snowfalls each winter.

Climate data for Portland, New South Wales (Jamieson St) (coordinates:33.35°S 149.99°E) (1961-1990)
Month	Jan	Feb	Mar	Apr	May	Jun	Jul	Aug	Sep	Oct	Nov	Dec	Year
Average rainfall mm (inches)	96.1 (3.78)	67.7 (2.67)	62.6 (2.46)	54.2 (2.13)	60.4 (2.38)	44.2 (1.74)	55.8 (2.20)	72.2 (2.84)	58.9 (2.32)	74.7 (2.94)	64.3 (2.53)	63.2 (2.49)	774.3 (30.48)
Source: Bureau of Meteorology

== The Crystal Theatre ==
Originally constructed as a theatre and public hall, the original building was destroyed by fire in 1925. Current release films are shown monthly and the hall is maintained by volunteers and available for community use.

== Signs of yesteryear ==
In 2001, Ron Bidwell, a signwriter by trade, together with his fellow "Letterheads" recreated vintage signs dating from 1895 to 1945 on local shop walls. ‘Painting Portland’ was a project initiated by Ron Bidwell and completed during the Letterheads Wallnuts Weekend, in 2001. Thirty-four signwriters travelled to Portland to work with locals to restore and reproduce advertising used in the early part of the 20th century. Goanna Salve, Kinkara Tea, Bushell's Tea, Mother's Choice Flour, Uncle Toby's Oats, Arnott's Biscuits, Toohey's Flag Ale, Solvol, Federal Safety Matches and Swagsman Blend Tea are a selection from the colourful Signs of Yesteryear. For the last 20 years the Portland Wallnuts continue to gather in Portland NSW on the last weekend in October every year, to celebrate the achievements of previous years and continue on the Tradition of Traditional Signwriting. In the last 20 years more than 200 signwriters from around the world have donated their time in painting more than 280 signs in Keeping the Signs of Yesteryear alive.

== Sporting clubs ==
- Portland Golf Club
- Portland Bowling Club
- Portland Olympic Pool
- Portland Colts Rugby League Club
- The Showground
- Gindaay Youth Centre
- Portland District Motor Sports Club

== Schools ==
- Portland Central School
- St Josephs School Portland

== Recreation areas ==
The well serviced town is surrounded by a combination of national parks, crown land, farming areas and forestry, and has many areas that are well known for outdoor recreation. Adjacent to the town is a 650-acre Town Common with the Williewa Creek and flats running through the centre. "The Williewa" is an open eucalypt forest with an abundance of Eucalyptus macrorhyncha (red stringybark) and native wildflowers and is popular with picnickers, mountain bikers and bushwalkers. There is a small well stocked dam and a plethora of birdlife as well as native wildlife, including Calyptorhynchus funereus (Yellow Tailed Black Cockatoo), Platycercus elegans (Crimson rosella), Alisterus scapularis (King Parrot) and Macropus giganteus (Eastern grey Kangaroo).

The surrounding forests are popular with 4WD and dirt bike enthusiasts. Sunny Corner, Ben Bullen, Wolgan and Newnes State forests are all nearby and bush camping is available.

Portland is also a popular destination for geocaching, as well as rogaining and orienteering. The town is close to the Wollemi National Park, the Gardens of Stone National Park and the Turon National Park.

Portland is abundant in wild foods dependent on season. Spring is when wild apples and stone fruits are in bloom. Summer is the season for ripe blackberries, which are a noxious weed, and the more difficult to locate stone fruits. During Autumn, apples, pears and quince are ripe and the forests are rich with mushrooms. Lactarius deliciosus and Boletes (Boletus portentosus) are safe to eat.

Trout fishing is possible in local streams and creeks, the best known spot being Thompson's Creek Dam which is a twenty-minute hike from the carpark on Thompson's Creek Rd via the Falnash State Forest.

== Transport ==
A railway station was opened at Portland with the name "Cullen Siding" in 1887, being renamed to Portland in 1889, the station was relocated in 1911. Passenger rail services ceased when services to Mudgee railway station ceased in 1985. Rail services included the Mudgee Mail in the 1960s, and diesel multiple unit services between Lithgow and Mudgee in the 1970s until closing in 1985.

As of 2020, Lithgow Buslines operates return services from Lithgow, and well as visiting Portland en route between Lithgow and Bathurst. NSW TrainLink also provide coach services between Lithgow and Gulgong via Portland

== Notable people ==
- Bob Allison, rugby league player
- John Baker, rugby league player
- Craig Bellamy, rugby league coach
- Bertie Brownlow, cricketer
- Joyce Fardell, librarian
- Martin Gallagher, rugby league player
- Johnny Greaves, rugby league player
- Jack Mackey, Victoria cross recipient
- Don Stait, rugby league player
