= Raffan's Mill and Brick Bottle Kilns =

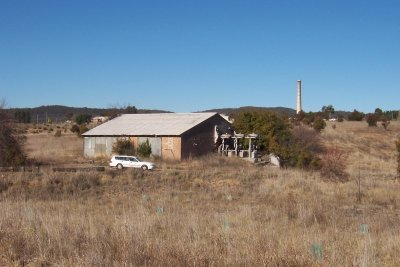
- Remains of 19th century Raffan's Mill

- Location within New South Wales Location within Australia
- 33°20′56″S 149°58′43″E
- Location: Carlton Road, Portland, New South Wales, Australia

History
- Built: 1884–1895

Site notes
- Owner: The Foundations, Portland NSW

New South Wales Heritage Register
- Official name: Raffan's Mill and Brick Bottle Kilns Precinct; Portland Cement Works Site; Williwa Street Portland;
- Type: State heritage (complex / group)
- Designated: 3 August 2012
- Reference no.: 1738
- Type: Kiln Lime
- Category: Manufacturing and Processing
- Builders: George Raffan and Alexander Currie

Raffan's Mill and Brick Bottle Kilns is a heritage-listed lime kiln at Carlton Road, Portland, New South Wales, Australia. It was built from 1884 to 1895 by George Raffan and Alexander Currie. It is also known as Raffan's Mill and Brick Bottle Kilns Precinct, Portland Cement Works Site, Williwa Street Portland. The property is owned by Boral. It was added to the New South Wales State Heritage Register on 3 August 2012.

== History ==
=== Aboriginal people and colonisation ===
Aboriginal occupation of the Blue Mountains area dates back at least 12,000 years and appears to have intensified some 3000–4000 years ago. In pre-colonial times the region around Portland was inhabited by Aboriginal people of the Wiradjuri linguistic group. European settlement in this region after the first documented white expedition west of the Blue Mountains in 1813 was tentative, largely because of concerns about resistance from Aboriginal people. There was contact, evidenced by sporadic hostility and by the quantity of surviving artefacts manufactured by the Aborigines from European glass. By 1840 there was widespread dislocation of Aboriginal culture, aggravated after 1850 by the gold rush to the region.

Jack Reed, a long-time resident of Portland, recalls how, as a child in the 1930s, he used to go hunting with two Aboriginal men named Jack and Jimmy. He estimated their birthdates as c.1890 and their visits to Portland as quite frequent. As part of the day these men would visit rock engravings (since removed) but never allow Jack to go near them. Neither spoke much English and both hunted with spears and boomerangs. While staying at Portland they camped close to the dam near the Portland Golf Course. Jack also remembers occasional groups of Aboriginal people coming to Portland to hold corroborees for the town's people.

The NSW National Parks & Wildlife Service register lists 19 Aboriginal sites in the immediate area of Portland, typically rock shelters or expanses of rock with archaeological deposits and sometimes with art and / or axe-grinding grooves, open sites with scatters of stone artefacts and carved trees. In 1982 two sites containing scatterings of stone artefacts were discovered in East Portland during an archaeological survey of the Ivanhoe Colliery for Blue Circle Southern Cement Ltd but these sites were not conserved for various reasons. There have been no Aboriginal sites associated with the Portland Cement Works and Quarries Site.

=== Portland and cement manufacture in Australia ===
In 1824 Portland cement had been developed in England by Joseph Aspdin, who named it after a pale grey coloured rock associated with Portland, England. Portland Cement is made by mixing limestone with either clay or shale in the right proportions and then burning the mixture at 1,100–1,200 °C (2,010–2,190 °F), a point at which the mixture begins to fuse. The resulting clinker is then ground to produce cement. Portland cement was a far superior building product and it caught on quickly in Europe and especially Germany but was infrequently used in Australia before the end of the 19th century. There is a reference in Australia that locates the earliest experiments with Portland cement at the Portland site in NSW in 1884 by the Cullen Bullen Lime & Cement Company.

In 1863 Thomas Murray first used the Portland site for lime extraction and production. During the 1880s, Currie and Raffan with others bought Portion 52 and formed the Cullen Bullen Lime & Marble Works. By 1889, the Cullen Bullen Lime & Marble Works had become the Cullen Bullen Lime & Cement Company and was producing Portland cement under the brand name of "Kangaroo". The cement was of variable quality and intermittent and production ceased in 1895. The only remnants of cement production from this era are the two bottle kilns in the northwest corner of Portion 52 and the old brick building known as 'Raffan's Mill'. In 1895 the Cullen Bullen Lime & Cement Company failed and was taken over by one of the original partners, George Raffan, and his brother John, who opened the Ivanhoe Lime and Cement Works & Colliery. In 1898 the Ivanhoe Lime and Cement Works & Colliery also failed. In 1899 these pioneering industrialists sold out to the (British-owned) New Zealand Mines Trust through their agent Dr August Scheidel who bought the land, plant, and leases. Scheidel, who "is considered the father of the modern cement industry in Australia", was born in Heidelberg and received his Ph.D. from Freiberg University in 1880. He obtained backing for an investment of £100,000 to build a cement production plant, which became the most successful cement manufacturing plant in Australia, and of which he remained Managing Director until 1918.

The Cullen Bullen Lime & Cement Company plants on the Portland site used eight static charge (bottle-shaped) kilns with millstone grinding, powered by a small steam plant. As high temperatures were necessary, the open end was of small diameter and chimney-shaped to conserve heat and to induce greater draught through the kiln. Layers of limestone, shale, and timber were hand-packed in each kiln, leaving space for a flue. The doors were then sealed and the kilns fired. The resulting batch of clinker was then removed. Two of these early bottle kilns – built of brick with iron ties and turnbuckles – and the milling plant in the northwest corner of Portion 52 stand as historical monuments to the beginning of the cement industry in NSW.

=== Timeline for Raffans Mill and the Bottle Kilns at the Portland Cement Works Site ===
- 12,000 BC onwards – Known Aboriginal occupation of this region.
- 1828 – MacPherson family took up a grant of 259 hectares (640 acres) and then another 259 hectares (640 acres) in 1832. The name Limestone Flat was associated with their property and they apparently used limestone found on their property in the building of their home(since demolished?).
- 1863 – Thomas Murray was granted 24 hectares (60 acres) (bought from Lawson?), Portion 52 in the parish of Cullen Bullen, County of Roxburgh. He built two lime kilns on the property sometime after 1869.
- 1863 – Thomas Murray used site for lime production (and presumably extraction) .
- 1882 – Thomas Murray sold Portion 52 to Charles Bate.
- 1882 – Alexander Currie and George Raffan became the owners of Portion 52 in August.
- 1887 – Currie and Raffan with others formed the Cullen Bullen Lime & Marble Works, which bought Portion 52 in this year.
- 1889-1895 – The Cullen Bullen Lime & Marble Works had become the Cullen Bullen Lime & Cement Company by this date. The company produced cement under the brand name of "Kangaroo". The cement was of variable quality and only produced intermittently on site until production ceased in 1895. The only remnants of cement production from this era are the two bottle kilns in the north-west corner of Portion 52 and the old brick building known as "Raffan's Mill".
- 1894 – Village of Portland gazetted, to the south of the cement company's lease, with 200 people recorded as living in the area.
- 1895 – The Cullen Bullen Lime & Cement Company failed and was taken over by one of the original partners, George Raffan and his brother John, who opened the Ivanhoe Lime and Cement Works & Colliery.
- 1898 – The Ivanhoe Lime and Cement Works & Colliery also failed.
- 1899 – The (British-owned) New Zealand Mines Trust through their agent Dr August Scheidel bought the land, plant and leases from the Raffan brothers. Scheidel, a metallurgist PhD with gold mining experience, obtained backing for an investment of A£100,000 to build a cement production plant, of which he remained Managing Director until 1918.
- 1900 – A new company was formed in December, the Commonwealth Portland Cement Company (CPCC) under the guidance of Scheidel, soon installed as Managing Director. Most of the plant was demolished and new works begun, including the installation of a new German Cripps plant.
- 1902-1991 – The site was used as a highly successful, high quality lime quarrying and cement production works, reaching its maximum levels of production in 1928. In the first half of the century it specialised in the "Dry Process" but in the 1940s it switched over to the "Wet Process", again requiring decommissioning of much equipment and substantial renewal of the plant.
- 1940s – The company changed hands to Associated Portland Cement Manufacturers U.K. (APCM). A decision was made to change form "dry process" to "wet process" and the old plant was decommissioned or refitted and a new No.1 Rotary kiln installed in 1951.
- 1974 – APCM merged with BHP and formed Blue Circle Southern Cement Ltd. This company also owned cement works at Maldon (near Picton), Charbon and later Berrima.
- 1992 – Blue Circle Southern Cement taken over by Boral.
- 1993 – Heritage assessment report focusing on the industrial archaeological values of the site was commissioned by Blue Circle Cement and completed by Peter Fenwick and Kate Holmes.
- 1998 – Boral closed down the limestone quarries and began dismantling the plant and rehabilitating the landscape in preparation for sale. Much of the cement works equipment has been taken off the site.
- 2003 – Heritage assessment report focusing on the future of the worker's cottages along Williwa Street but also appraising the site generally was commissioned by prospective buyer Lloyd Monck and completed by Colin Israel of Noel Bell Ridley Smith & Partners.

== Description ==
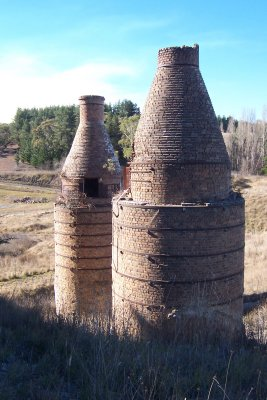
Two remaining 19th century brick bottle kilns at north of Portland Cement Works site

The two remaining brick Bottle Kilns (out of the eight built) c. 1889 are extremely rare and constructed in brick with iron ties and turnbuckles. These static lime kilns are approximately 14 metres high and 5 metres body diameter and are constructed from standard bricks to a thickness of 540mm. Steel clamping bands have been fitted around the body of the kilns at an average interval of 700mm.

Located on the north west corner of Portion 52, the bottle kilns in close physical relationship with 'Raffan's Mill' c. 1889 - a small, single level, nineteenth century brick structure still displaying its mill grinding machinery. Also rare, the mill consists of three separate areas and appears to have been part of a larger complex. The building dimensions are 15.5 metres (51 ft) long, 12.7 metres (42 ft) wide and 6.4 metres (21 ft) high to the peak of the gable. The roof and half of the northern wall are sheeted with galvanised corrugated iron with all other walls being 370 millimetres (15 in) thick brick laid in English bond. The western side of the building has three large hinged door openings, with the northern end having been utilised as a general store. The southern end was once used as a blacksmiths shop. Internally there is evidence of a mezzanine level supported by 300-millimetre (12 in) timber beams, with windows and a number of unidentified operational openings having been bricked up. Through the southern wall, extends a shaft-driven system of wooden toothed gear wheels and four 1,200-millimetre (47 in) diameter Burr Stone Grinding Mills. The millstone grinding plant was installed between 1889 and 1895 to grind the cement clinker from the bottle kilns. It is of cast iron with three granite millstones. The large gear wheels have removable timber cogs held in place by pegs. Originally the plant was connected by belt to a small steam engine which no longer remains. Some surrounding structure have also gone.

Together these groups stand as historical monuments to the beginning of the cement industry in NSW. This group has been classified by the National Trust and also forms a focus of the local LEP heritage listing. The Fenwick & Holmes 1993 study and the NBRS&P; 2003 study all agree that this group is of State significance as an intact remnant of in situ nineteenth century industrial technology.

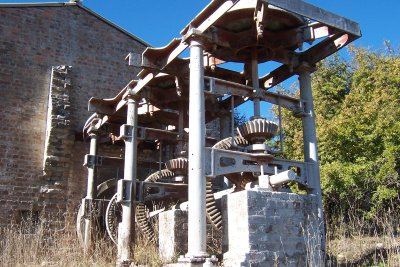
Old milling machinery

=== Condition ===
As at 5 May 2005, the grinding plant is in good condition although exposed to the weather. Since most of the connecting structures have gone, a scheme to protect the plant would help its conservation. The remnant standing remains of the Raffan's Mill are in reasonable condition, with the shaft driven wooden-toothed gear system exposed to the elements. Some surface rust is apparent and the wooden gears need protection.

Both Brick Bottle Kilns display signs of wear and exposure, but also remain in reasonable condition. One kiln is in good condition and one has lost some bricks from its top conical section. Cracks are apparent between some brick courses while grass and small shrubs are growing from the upper levels

Both the Raffan's Mill building and the Brick Bottle Kilns have lost much of their surrounding infrastructure that was part of the nineteenth century complex. However, the remaining mill and two Bottle Brick Kilns display a relatively high level of integrity and their association to each other and the surrounding landscape remains clear.

=== Further information ===
Both Raffan's mill and the Brick Bottle Kilns should be stabilised. This should include the removal of intrusive vegetation, particularly concerning the Bottle Kilns.

== Heritage listing ==
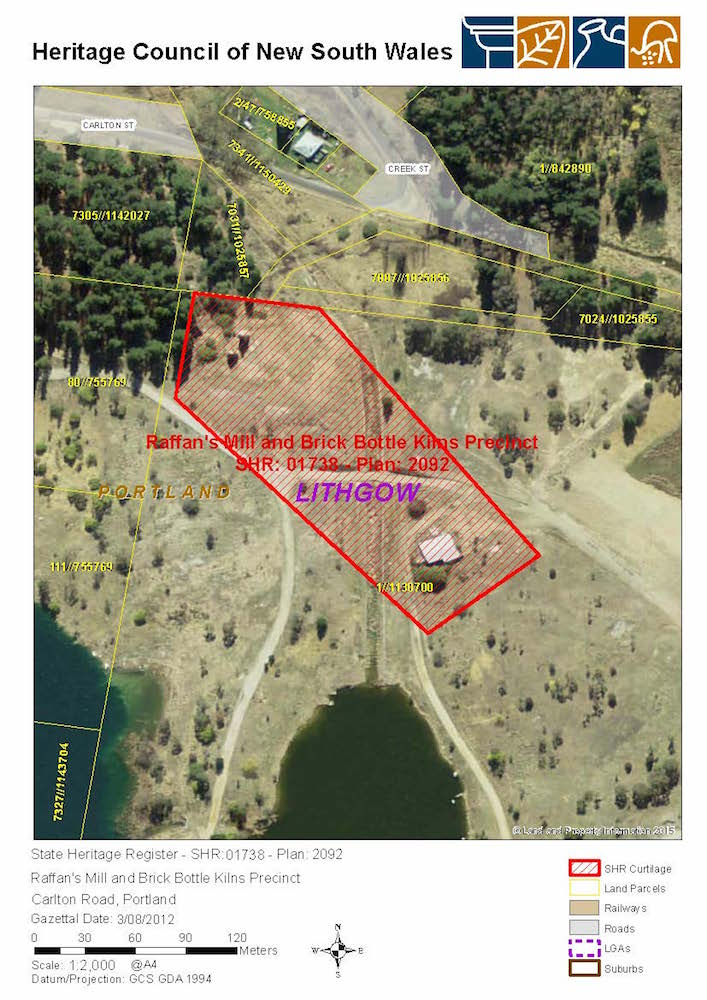
Heritage boundaries

As at 4 July 2013, The Raffan's Mill and Brick Bottle Kilns are of State significance as outstanding and rare remnants of a nineteenth century lime and cement manufacturing plant in a still legible industrial landscape. Their development is closely linked to the origin of the associated town of Portland and to the later development of the Commonwealth Portland Cement Works. The Raffan's Mill and Brick Bottle Kilns represent the genesis of the Portland cement industry in NSW and the beginnings of a century of cement production at Portland.

Raffan's Mill and Brick Bottle Kilns was listed on the New South Wales State Heritage Register on 3 August 2012 having satisfied the following criteria.

The place is important in demonstrating the course, or pattern, of cultural or natural history in New South Wales.

Raffan's Mill and the Brick Bottle Kilns are of State significance as 19th century remnants of the site of commercial production of lime and the site of the first commercial production of Portland cement. The Cullen Bullen Lime and Marble Works and the Cullen Bullen Lime and Cement Company were the direct forebears of the Commonwealth Portland Cement Works and their early successes encouraged the establishment of the town of Portland.

The place has a strong or special association with a person, or group of persons, of importance of cultural or natural history of New South Wales's history.

The Raffan's Mill and Brick Bottle Kilns are of local significance for their associations with early pioneers in Portland Cement manufacture in NSW, notably George Raffan and John Raffan.

The place is important in demonstrating aesthetic characteristics and/or a high degree of creative or technical achievement in New South Wales.

The two bottle-shaped, brick kilns are of State significance for their aesthetic qualities as distinctive examples of nineteenth century kilns and as part of a remnant nineteenth century industrial landscape. They have outstanding local significance and landmark qualities as a picturesque remnant of the first attempt to bring the cement manufacturing industry to the town.

The place has a strong or special association with a particular community or cultural group in New South Wales for social, cultural or spiritual reasons.

The potential social significance of Raffan's Mill and Bottle Kilns has not been researched.

The place has potential to yield information that will contribute to an understanding of the cultural or natural history of New South Wales.

The Raffan's Mill and Brick Bottle Kilns are of State significance for their technical values as rare surviving examples of nineteenth century lime and cement production technologies. They have potential to yield further information, through archaeological investigation, of the early Portland Cement industry in NSW.

The place possesses uncommon, rare or endangered aspects of the cultural or natural history of New South Wales.

The two Bottle Kilns in combination with Raffan's Mill are of State significance for being extremely rare as intact, in situ remnants of nineteenth century industrial technology. It is very unusual to find such a legible industrial site of this age in NSW that still clearly displays its relationship to the landscape that provided the raw materials as well as the relationship between milling of limestone and the baking of cement. This rarity and significance is enhanced by the juxtaposition of these relics to the continuing use of the Portland Cement Works Site, nearby, throughout the twentieth century for much larger-scale quarrying and commercial manufacture of the same product. The surviving mill machinery attached to the Raffan's Mill building are rare surviving examples of use of hardwood pegs as teeth in the mill wheels and cogs.

The place is important in demonstrating the principal characteristics of a class of cultural or natural places/environments in New South Wales.

The Raffan's Mill and Bottle Brick Kilns are of State significance as fine examples of nineteenth-century lime and cement making equipment. They are outstanding remnants of an industrial enterprise interrelated with the genesis and development of a rural town, as well as the precursor to a larger cement-making complex that operated through much of the twentieth century.
