= Ben Bullen =

- Town
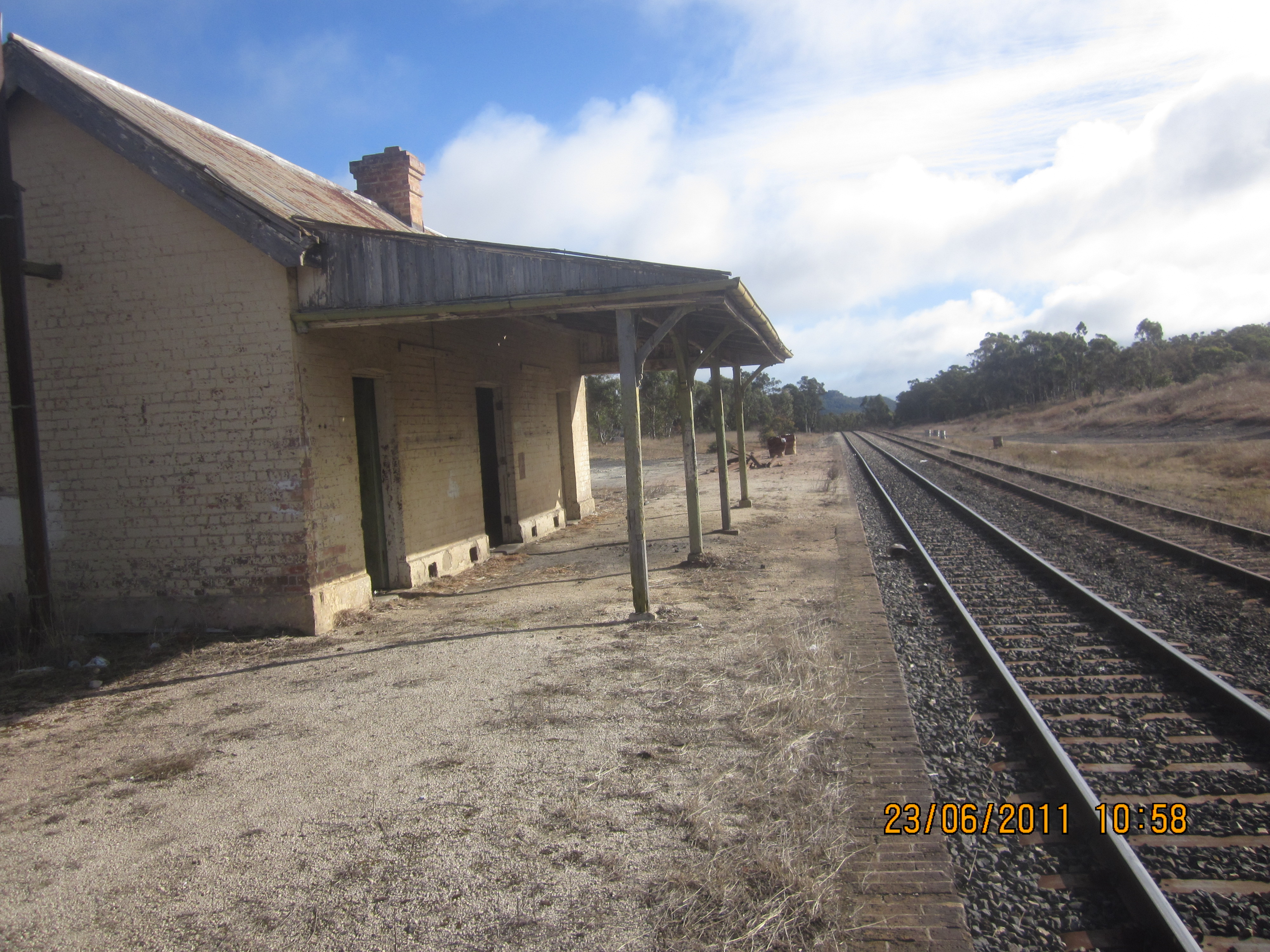
- Ben Bullen railway station in 2011

- Coordinates: 33°13′10″S 150°01′19″E
- Country: Australia
- State: New South Wales
- LGA: City of Lithgow
- Location: 174 km (108 mi) NW of Sydney; 36 km (22 mi) N of Lithgow; 10 km (6.2 mi) S of Capertee

Government
  - State electorate: Bathurst
  - Federal division: Calare
- Elevation: 872 m (2,861 ft)

Population
  - Total: 100 (2016 census)
- Postcode: 2790

Ben Bullen is a small mountain village in the Central West of New South Wales, Australia. It is located on the Castlereagh Highway (almost) halfway between the small towns of Cullen Bullen and Capertee. In the 2016 census, it recorded a population of 100 people. The place name Ben Bullen is derived from the local Aboriginal word meaning "high, quiet place".

The village was formed when the railway was constructed in the early 1880s. While goods trains still use the railway line the small railway station is closed. Since the closure of the railway station a bus service serves the community.

Ben Bullen is surrounded by picturesque cattle grazing land and the Gardens of Stone National Park. Farming and coal mining are the main local employers.

== Heritage listing ==
Ben Bullen railway station on the Wallerawang-Gwabegar railway is heritage listed.
