= Hammerstone Project =

Birch Mountain Resources' Muskeg Valley Quarry in Northern Alberta

Coordinates: 57°11′15″N 111°32′51″W

The Hammerstone Quarry is a quarry in Alberta, Canada with 750 million tonnes of limestone reserves. It was an expansion of Birch Mountain Resources' Muskeg Valley Quarry in Northern Alberta, north of Fort McMurray, in Fort McKay, where Birch Mountain owned mineral rights on nearly one million acres in the heart of the oil sands region. As of 2024, it is owned by Burnco Rock Products Ltd.

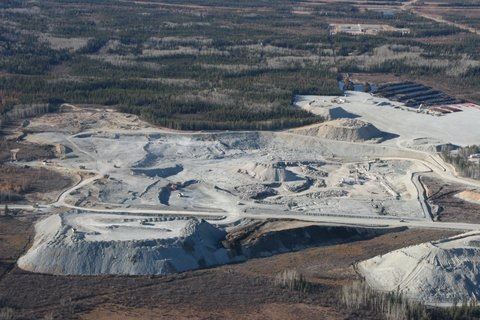
The Hammerstone Quarry covers an area over 3700 acres.

The Hammerstone Quarry Project had approximately 1 billion tonnes of proven and probable limestone reserves, making it the largest Quarry in Canada, for use to meet the projected demands for limestone and limestone products in the Athabasca region to the year 2060, where there is a known shortage of quality aggregate and limestone materials. The expansion was to include the aggregate quarry, a lime plant and cement plant. In the 2006 EIA report, Birch Mountain Resources estimated that the Project construction cost would be about $674 million (2006 dollars). Construction was initially proposed to start in 2006 and was targeted for completion in 2040. Birch Mountain Resources modified the processing plant design in 2007 and the resulting construction cost was revised to $578 million. Later, after the transfer of assets to Hammerstone Corp, a subsidiary of Brookfield Asset Management Special Situations Group, indicated that current cost estimates were used in 2009 to amend the Project construction cost to $737 million. Limestone products were to include construction aggregate for concrete and asphalt, as well as limestone-based products for cement and flue-gas desulphurization (FGD) for the oil sands extraction process.

== Recent history ==
PricewaterhouseCoopers (PwC) was appointed receiver of Birch Mountain Resources at the request of Tricap Partners Ltd., when Birch Mountain defaulted on its debts and on November 5, 2008, Birch Mountain was forced into receivership. On Nov 26, 2008 Alberta 1439442, later to become Hammerstone Corporation, was created by Brookfield. On Nov 27, 2008 James Pattison, Director of Brookfield, received an Assignment and Option Agreement deal from Alberta 1439442 in exchange for selling his debenture shares to Brookfield. The assets were transferred on Jan 8, 2009 and included nearly 1 billion tonnes of limestone reserves, along with permits and leases for limestone and other minerals covering over 700,000 additional acres, to Alberta Corporation 1439442, subsidiary of Tricap Partners Ltd. now operating privately under the name Hammerstone Corporation, a subsidiary of Brookfield Asset Management Special Situations Group for approximately $50 million. The assets from the Hammerstone Quarry Project were valued at over $1.6 Billion dollars in an independent NI 43-101 Technical Report conducted by AMEC in 2006. The study also looked at market demand and supply in the area. The Hammerstone Corporation is currently operating the quarry which recently announced a new business contract.

The Birch Mountain common stock traded as high as $7.99 and went to less than .01 cent a share by November 2008. The Birch Mountain Shareholders for Justice began working on their case and on September 22, 2010, a lawsuit against Brookfield Asset Management was filed with the Superior Court of Justice in Ontario, Canada. The lawsuit challenges the acquisition and transfer of the approximately $2 billion asset from a public company, Birch Mountain Resources, to a private company, the Hammerstone Corporation, a subsidiary of Brookfield Special Situations Group (formerly Tricap Partners LTD). Both Brookfield and the plaintiff spent much of 2011 arguing on whether the trial should be held in Ontario, where Brookfield Asset Management is incorporated, or in Alberta, where the assets are located. The defendant, Brookfield, filed a motion that the plaintiff lacked jurisdiction in Ontario with the Superior Court of Justice and Brookfield's motion was upheld by the courts, which also awarded Brookfield costs. In November, 2012, the Supreme Court of Canada declined to hear an appeal of the Ontario court's decision on jurisdiction, and again awarded Brookfield costs.

On May 1, 2014, a Case Management Order was entered by the Honourable Madam Justice Strekaf transferring the Ontario Superior Court Action to the Court of Queen's Bench of Alberta. Then on May 14 an Order was entered by the Honourable Justice Perell that the stay of the Ontario Superior Court Action bearing Court File Number 10-CV-410910, ordered April 26, 2011 be vacated and be transferred to the Court of Queen's Bench of Alberta. Based on this decision, an Amended Statement of Claim bearing Court File Number 1401-05797 was filed in the Court of Queen's Bench of Alberta on May 27, 2014, with former NHL star Lanny McDonald being named as the Representative Plaintiff for the Birch Mountain shareholders. The Case is on-going and expected to be heard in October. The case was dismissed, after the judge ruled it had no legal merit in April, 2015. On May 25, 2015, the plaintiffs filed a notice of appeal and the Appeal Factum is due November 18, 2015. On November 23, 2015, the Appellant filed an Appeal from the Order of The Honourable Madam Justice Strekaf dated and filed April 30, 2015 in McDonald v. Brookfield Asset Management Inc. in the Court of Appeal Alberta. A copy of the Appeal Factum, Appeal Application for New Evidence and the Appeal Memoranda of New Evidence dated November 23, 2015 can be found on the Case developments page.

The Appeal over the Hammerstone Project MegaQuarry was dismissed in 2016 by an Alberta Court, and a in 2017 the Supreme Court refused to hear the case.

In May 2024 it was announced that Calgary-based Burnco Rock Products Ltd. had purchased Hammerstone Infrastructure Materials, which had run the quarry, from Brookfield Business Partners for an undisclosed amount of money.

== See also ==
- Limestone
- Quarries
- Brookfield Asset Management
