= Seaham Quarry =

Geological site in New South Wales, Australia

- Location within New South Wales Location within Australia
- 32.6631°S 151.7272°E
- Location: Torrence Street, Seaham, Port Stephens Council, New South Wales, Australia

New South Wales Heritage Register
- Official name: Seaham Quarry
- Type: state heritage (landscape)
- Designated: 2 April 1999
- Reference no.: 23
- Type: Geological site or area
- Category: Landscape - Natural

Seaham Quarry is a heritage-listed former quarry and now geological site at Torrence Street, Seaham, Port Stephens Council, New South Wales, Australia. It was added to the New South Wales State Heritage Register on 2 April 1999.

== History ==
The glacigene origin of the Carboniferous sediments in the Seaham area was first recognised by Professor Edgeworth David in 1914. Subsequently, Sussmilch reported the occurrence of varved shales in the Seaham Quarry, which rapidly gained famed in Australia and internationally because of the perfection of preservation of the varves and the associated contorted beds exposed in them. David exhibited specimens of the varved shales in Honolulu in 1920 at the First Pan Pacific Science Congress, and three years later led a party of visiting scientists to the quarry on the occasion of the Second Pan Pacific Science Congress. In 1925 a signboard describing the phenomena exposed in the quarry was erected in the site.

In 1979 the Geological Society of Australia (New South Wales Division) nominated the site for an Interim Conservation Order. The order was sought as the site was for sale and possible development. On 12 April 1979 an Interim Conservation Order was placed over the site to provide time for further investigation. On 14 December 1979 a Permanent Conservation Order was placed over the site. The site was transferred onto the State Heritage Register on 2 April 1999.

== Description ==
Seaham Quarry is a small, disused shale quarry at Seaham, 14 kilometres northwest of Raymond Terrace. The quarry walls are north facing and one to two metres high. In 1925 a signboard was erected by Edgeworth David proclaiming the area is to be "preserved in perpetuity".

The varved sediments in the Seaham Quarry belong to the Upper Carboniferous Seaham Formation, equivalent to the Main Glacial Beds of Osborne (1922). In the Seaham area the formation consists of 600mm of tillite, varved shale, aqueo-glacial conglomerate, tuffaceous sandstone, and mudstone. Osborne (1925) recognised three tillite and three varved shale horizons, of which that exposed in the quarry is the lower-most and thickest.

Crowell and Frakes (1971, p. 137) described the appearance of the strata in the quarry as follows: "Laminated clay-shale layers, from 5 mm to 10 cm are separated by thinner fine-sandstone layers, from a few millimetres to a centimetre in thickness. Many thin sandstone units are graded, and locally display starved ripples with shapes and internal cross-laminations indicating the sense of current transport. Scattered through the section are rounded pebbles up to 6 cm in diameter...which occur within thicker mudstone layers as well as on bedding planes demarcated by graded sandstones".

Occasional pockets of such pebbles were observed by Sussmilch. Glaessner (1957) described and illustrated a new species of arthropod trace fossil, Isododichnus osbornei, from varve shales at Seaham. The exact locality is not stated but the specimens were most likely collected from the quarry where they had previously been recorded as annelid tracks. The probable depositional environment of the quarry strata, as envisaged by Rattigan (1967) and other workers, was a shallow periglacial lake which received sediment influxes via turbidity currents. Low velocity traction currents modified the surface of these lake bed deposits, and ice-rafted pebbles (derived from moraines) were dropped into them at intervals from melting floes and icebergs. Crowell and Frakes (1971) consider that this glaciation was of alpine type and took place at a (late Carboniferous) latitude of 45-50 degree S.

Perhaps the most spectacular features exposed in the quarry are localised contorted beds interstratified between apparently undisturbed layers and laterally continuous with undeformed planar strata. The height of the contorted layers ranges from a few centimetres to a metre or more. In Edgeworth David's day, the cause of the deformation was thought to be "the dragging force of glacial ice or icebergs". However Fairbridge (1947), who reviewed in detail seven possible explanations of the origin of the contortions, concluded that gravitational slumping – probably due to release of water from impounded glacial lakes, or over loading, was the most likely cause. Subsequent investigators considered that some of the contorted layers could equally well have resulted from grounding of icebergs and floes.

Rattigan (1967) described a variety of other deformational phenomena from these strata, including lode and flow structures, intraformational fracturing, penecontemporaneous sand intrusions, and non-hydrodynamic ripple forms. He proposed earthquake-activated slumping as a possible mechanism of formation.

The other feature of the strata exposed in the quarry which has attracted scientific interest is the significance of the laminations. The explanation on the signboard reflects the view of early workers in the area that the alternation of coarse and fine bands was attributable to seasonal deposition, and that the approximate time taken for accumulation could be established by counting pairs of layers. Sussmilch estimated that all-out 3000 years would have been required to deposit the total thickness of varve shales (some 60 m) in the Seaham district, but the accuracy of this measurement was questioned by Osborne (1925) because it disregarded the effects of contemporaneous erosion, non-annual depositional rhythms, and weathering-induced variability in prominence of laminations. The exceptional preservation of the Seaham varves (considering their age) prompted the Swedish scientist Carl Caldenius to investigate their potential use in geochronology (a section was actually measured for this purpose at Paterson nearby. However, subsequent workers (e.g. Crowell and Frakes. 1971) have been more cautious about use of the term varves in reference to the Seaham strata, as the rhythmic bedding exhibited has not been proven to follow an annual cycle.

The quarry itself could be detrimentally affected by indiscriminate and quite unnecessary use of geological hammers.

== Heritage listing ==
Seaham Quarry is significant to the history of Australian geology and its associations with the famous Australian geologist, Professor Edgeworth David who first recognised the glacigene origin of the Carboniferous sediments in the Seaham area in 1914. Seaham Quarry is of international scientific importance because of the perfection of preservation of its varied shales and the associated contorted beds exposed in them. The shale deposits are estimated by scientists to be more than 300 million years old. The quarry contains, in its shale deposits, evidence of the glacial origin of rocks in the Hunter River Valley.

Seaham Quarry was listed on the New South Wales State Heritage Register on 2 April 1999 having satisfied the following criteria.

The place is important in demonstrating the course, or pattern, of cultural or natural history in New South Wales.

Seaham Quarry is significant to the history of Australian geology and its associations with the famous Australian geologist, Professor Edgeworth David who first recognised the glacigene origin of the Carboniferous sediments in the Seaham area in 1914.

The place has potential to yield information that will contribute to an understanding of the cultural or natural history of New South Wales.

Seaham Quarry is of international scientific importance because of the perfection of preservation of its varied shales and the associated contorted beds exposed in them. The shale deposits are estimated by scientists to be more than 300 million years old. The quarry contains, in its shale deposits, evidence of the glacial origin of rocks in the Hunter River Valley.
