= Quarry =

Place where geological material has been excavated

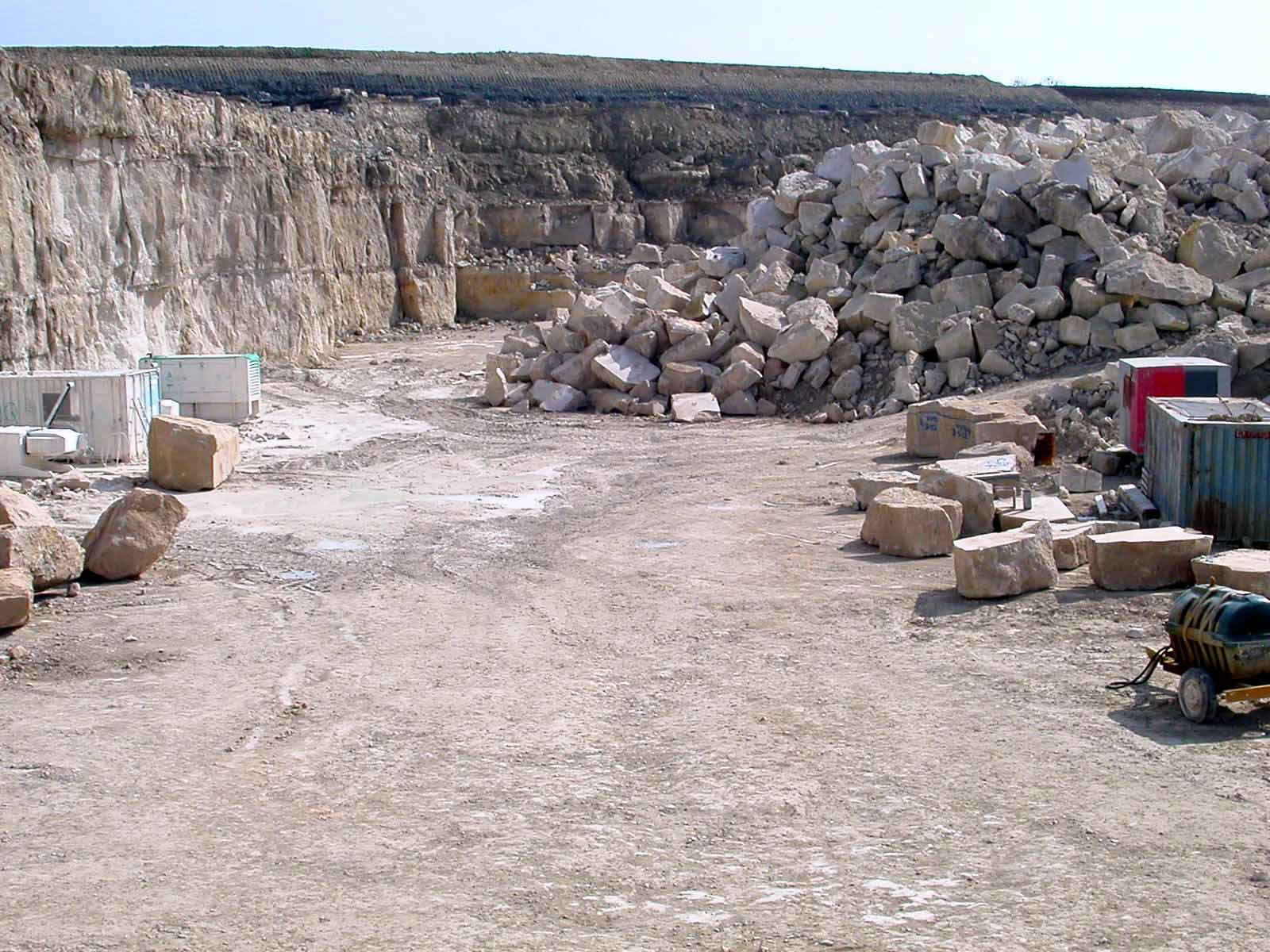
A Portland stone quarry on the Isle of Portland, England

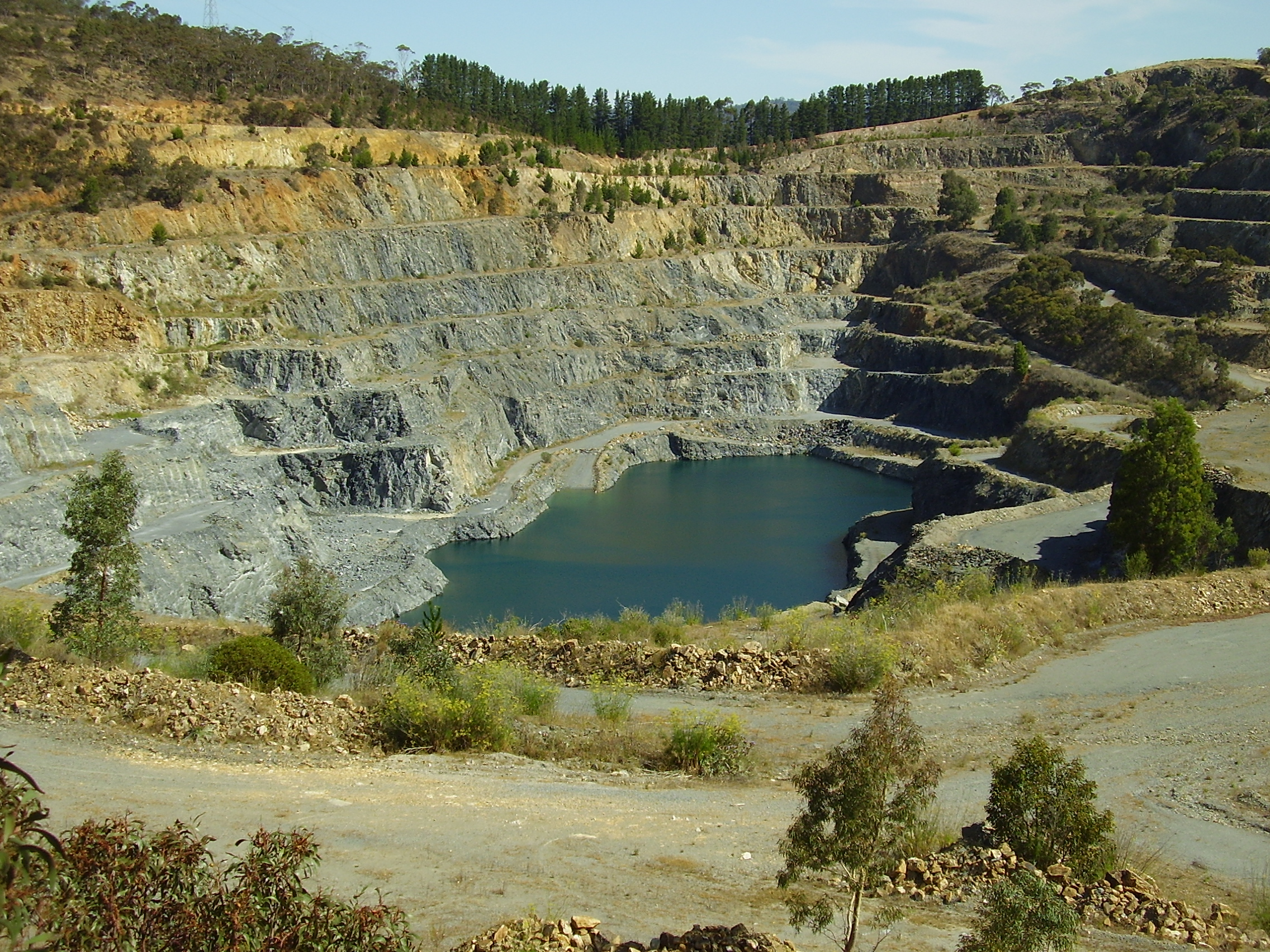
An abandoned construction aggregate quarry near Adelaide, South Australia

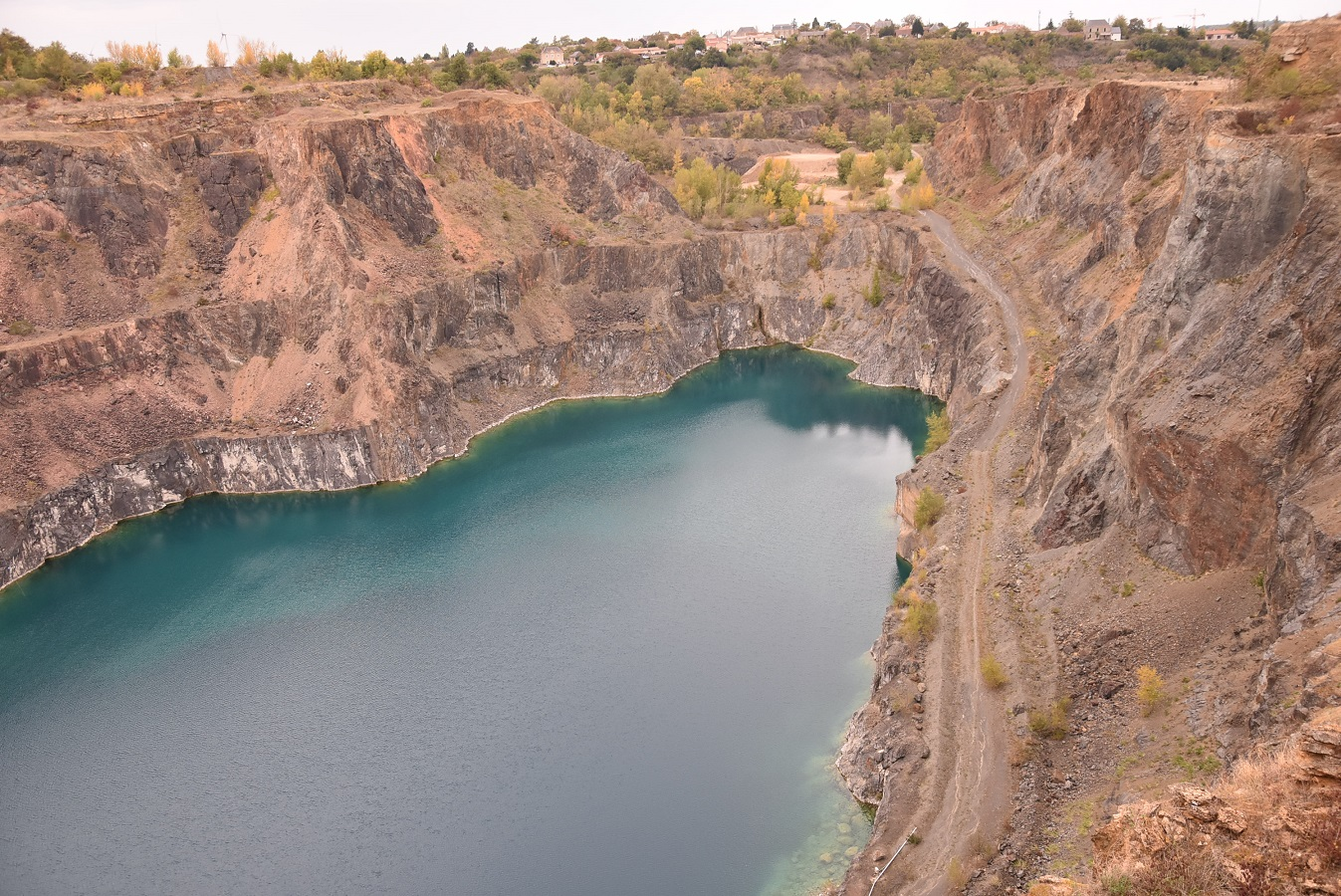
An abandoned construction aggregate quarry with turquoise pond near Thouars, France

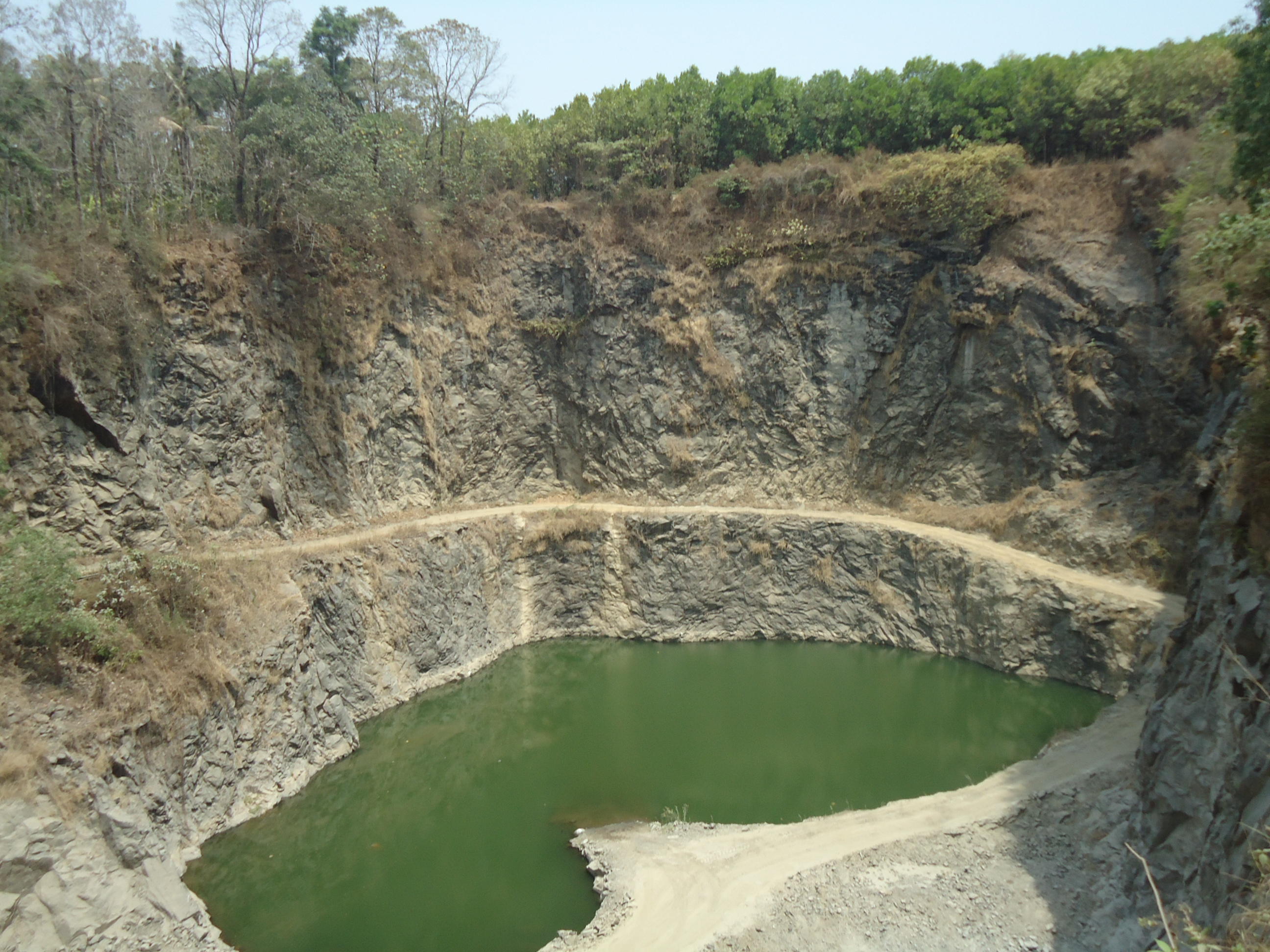
An abandoned stone quarry in Kerala, India

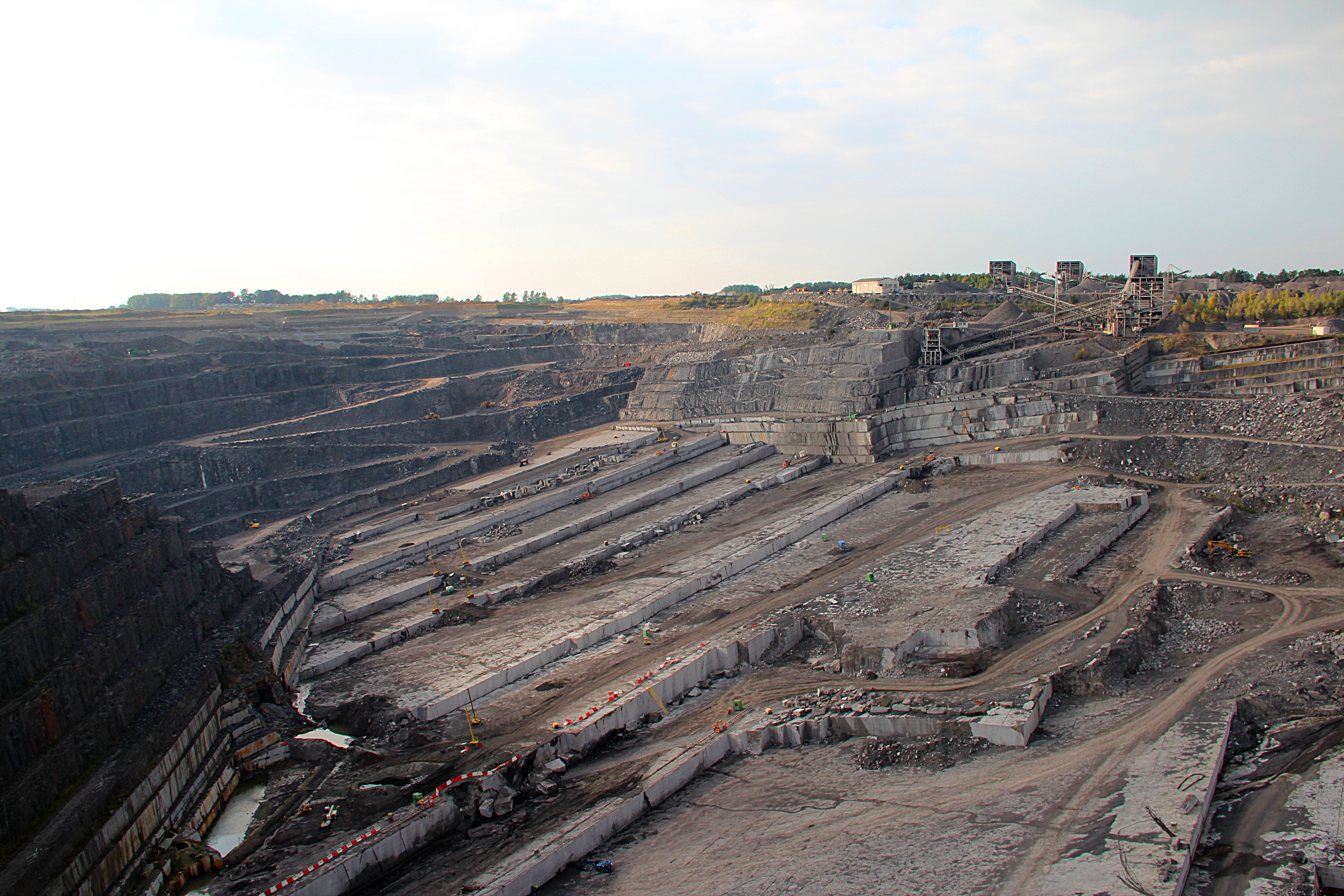
Stone quarry in Soignies, Hainaut (province), Belgium

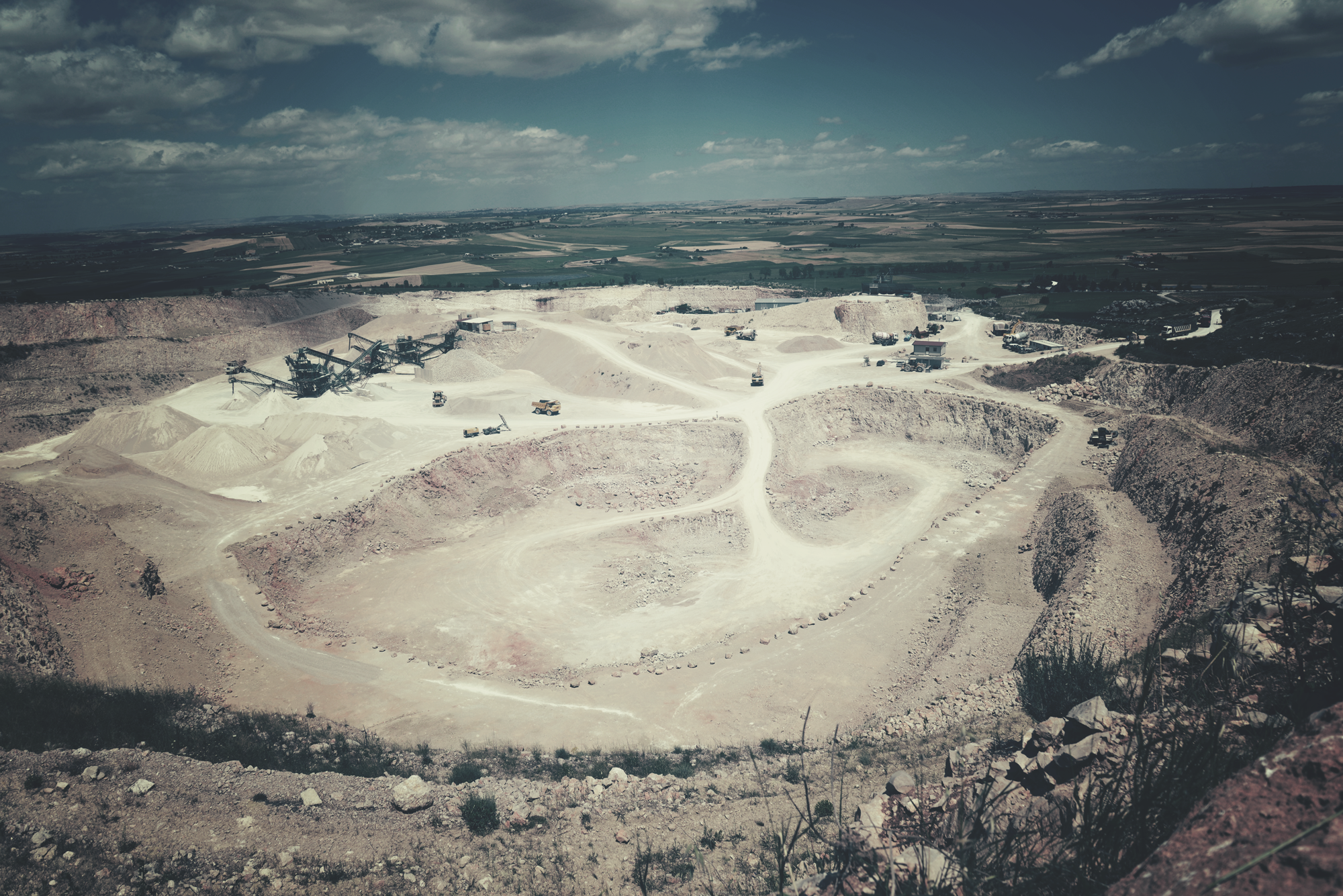
Matera quarry in Basilicata, Italy

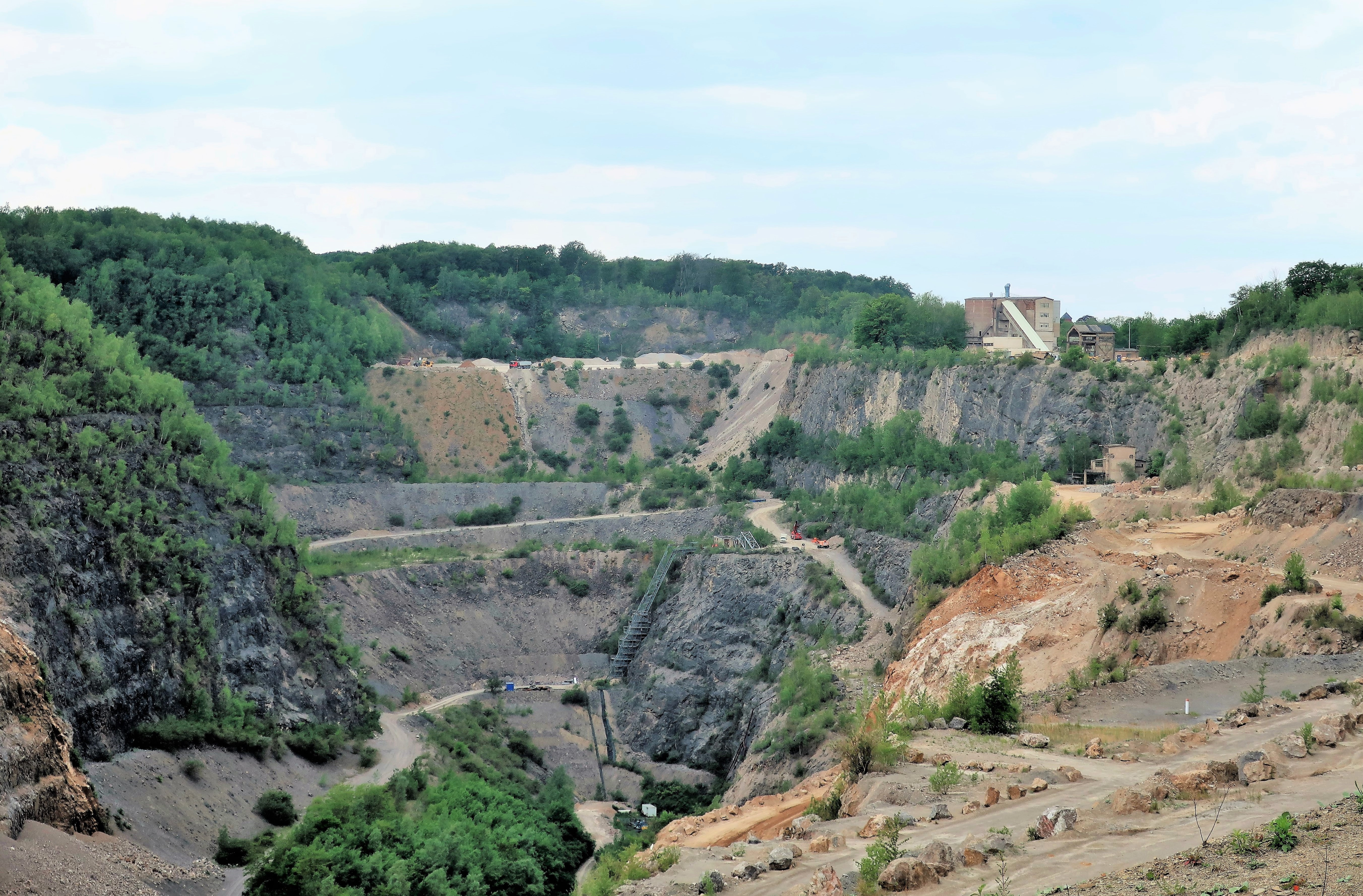
Donnerkuhle Quarry, near Hagen, Germany

A quarry is a place where rock and earth materials – such as limestone, marble, granite, gravel, and sand – are excavated. The operation of quarries is regulated in some jurisdictions to manage their safety risks and reduce their environmental impact.

== History ==
The stone industry is one of the oldest in the world. Creation of stone tools (microliths industry) in the region of South Africa has been dated to about 70,000–60,000 years ago. Granite and marble mining has existed as far back as ancient Egypt. Crushed stone was used extensively by the first great road building civilizations, such as ancient Greece and ancient Rome.

In the 18th century, the use of drilling and blasting operations was mastered.

== Stone industry ==
Stone industry refers to the part of the primary sector of the economy, similar to the mining industry, but concerned with excavations of stones, in particular granite, marble, slate and sandstone. Other products of the industry include crushed stone and dimension stone.

== Types of rock ==
Types of rock extracted from quarries include:

- Chalk
- Chert
- China clay
- Cinder
- Clay
- Coal
- Construction aggregate (sand and gravel)
- Coquina
- Diabase
- Flint
- Gabbro
- Granite
- Gritstone
- Gypsum
- Limestone
- Marble
- Ores
- Phosphate rock
- Quartz
- Sandstone
- Slate
- Travertine

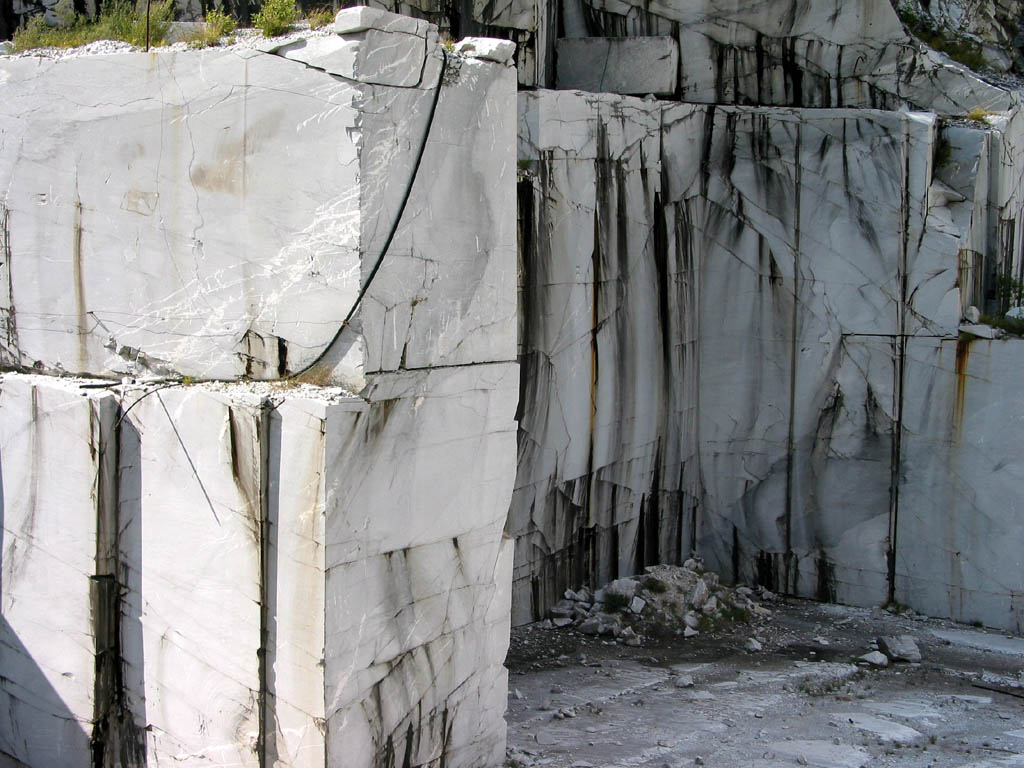

== Methods of quarrying ==
The method of removal of stones from their natural bed by using different operations is called quarrying. Methods of quarrying include:

- Digging – This method is used when the quarry consists of small and soft pieces of stones.
- Heating – This method is used when the natural rock bed is horizontal and small in thickness.
- Wedging – This method is used when the hard rock consists of natural fissure. When natural fissures are absent then artificial fissures are prepared by drilling holes.
- Blasting – It is the process of removing stone using controlled explosives placed in drilled holes. Line of least resistance plays a very important role in the blasting process.

The following steps are used in the blasting process:

- Drilling holes – Blast holes are drilled by using drilling machines.
- Charging – Explosive powders are fed into the cleaned & dried blast holes.
- Tamping – The remaining portion of the blast holes are filled by clay, ash, fuse and wirings.
- Firing – The fuses of blasting holes are fired by using electrical power supply or match sticks.

== Slabs ==
Many quarry stones such as marble, granite, limestone, and sandstone are cut into larger slabs and removed from the quarry. The surfaces are polished and finished with varying degrees of sheen or luster. Polished slabs are often cut into tiles or countertops and installed in many kinds of residential and commercial properties. Natural stone quarried from the earth is often considered a luxury and tends to be a highly durable surface, thus highly desirable.

== Problems ==
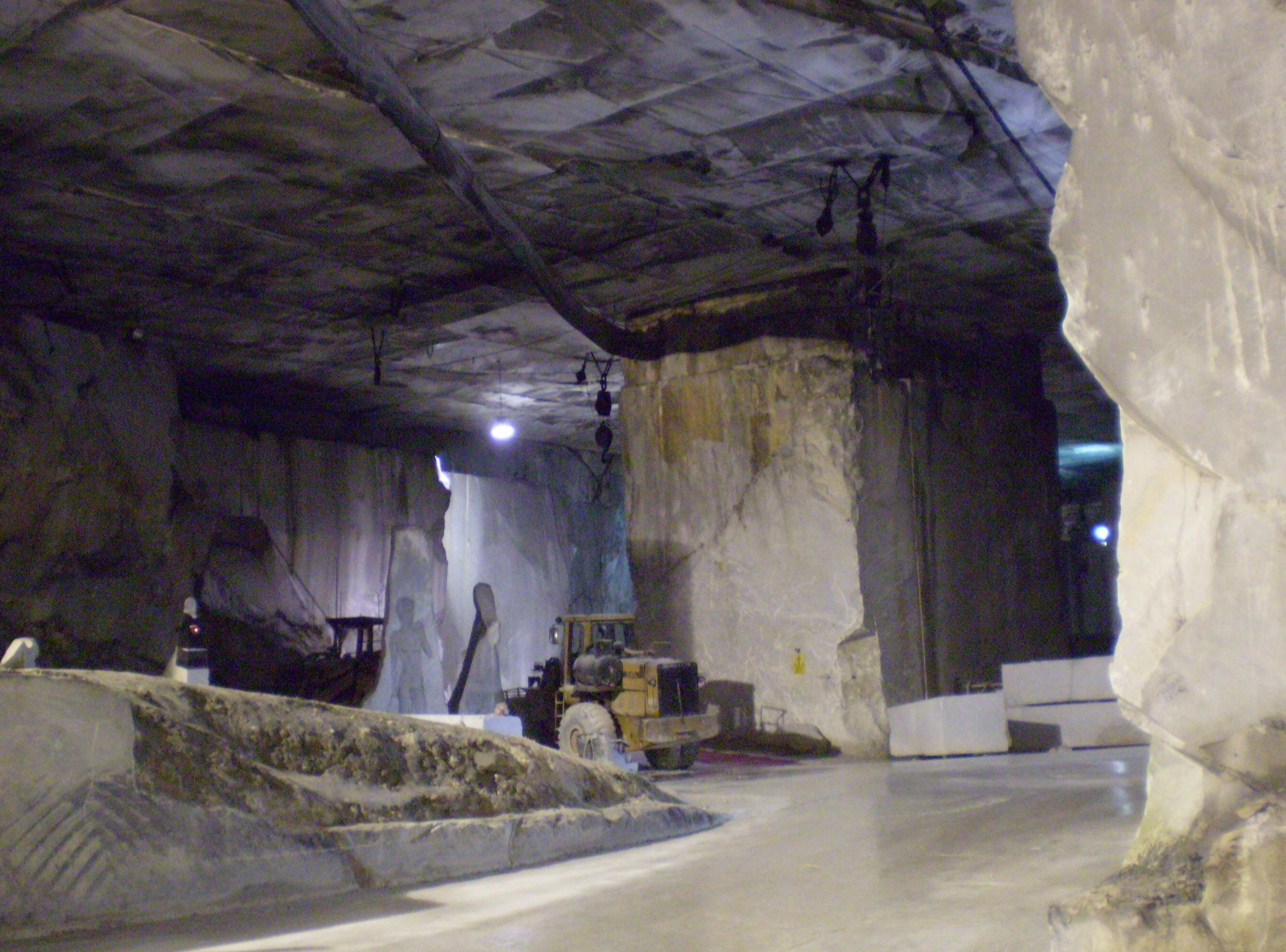
Extraction work in a marble quarry in Carrara, Italy

Quarries in level areas that are located in flat terrain, in places where groundwater sits close to the surface, or which are located close to surface water often have engineering problems with drainage. Generally the water is removed by pumping while the quarry is operational, but for high inflows more complex approaches may be required. For example, the Coquina quarry is excavated to more than 60 feet (18 m) below sea level.

To reduce surface leakage, a moat lined with clay was constructed around the entire quarry. Groundwater entering the pit is pumped up into the moat. As a quarry becomes deeper, water inflows generally increase and it also becomes more expensive to lift the water higher during removal; this can become the limiting factor in quarry depth. Some water-filled quarries are worked from beneath the water, by dredging.

Many people and municipalities consider quarries to be eyesores and require various abatement methods to address problems with noise, dust, and appearance. A well-known effective and famous example of successful quarry restoration is Butchart Gardens in Victoria, British Columbia, Canada.

A further problem is pollution of roads from trucks leaving the quarries. To control and restrain the pollution of public roads, wheel washing systems are becoming more common.

=== Quarry lakes ===
Many quarries naturally fill with water after abandonment and become lakes. Others are made into landfills.

Water-filled quarries can be very deep, often 50 ft (15 m) or more, and surprisingly cold, so swimming in quarry lakes is generally not recommended. Unexpectedly cold water can cause a swimmer's muscles to suddenly weaken; it can also cause shock and even hypothermia. Though quarry water is often very clear, submerged quarry stones, abandoned equipment, dead animals and strong currents make diving into these quarries extremely dangerous. Several people drown in quarries each year. However, many inactive quarries are converted into safe swimming sites.

Such lakes, even lakes within active quarries, can provide important habitat for animals.

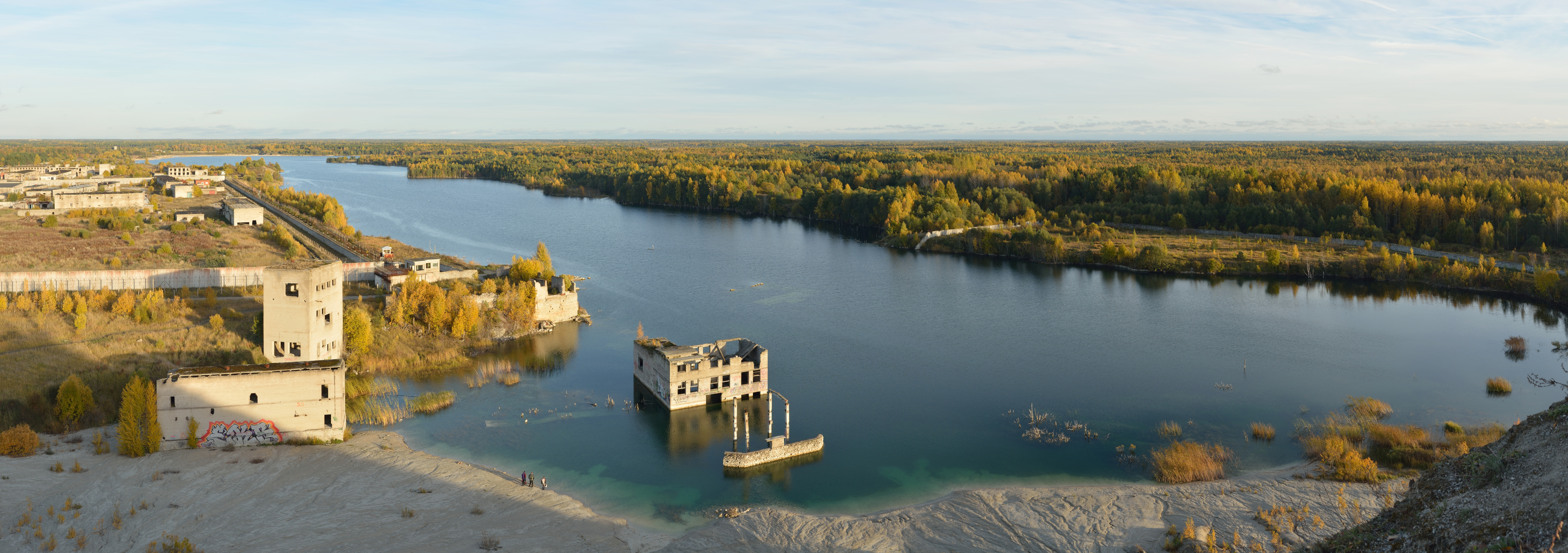
An abandoned limestone quarry in Rummu, Estonia

== See also ==
- Automated mining
- Building material
- Clay pit
- Coal mining
- Collecting fossils
- Dry stone
- Fair Stone standard
- Gravel pit
- List of minerals
- List of quarries
- List of quarries in the United States
- List of rock types
- List of stones
- Miner
- Mining
- Mountaintop removal mining
- Opencast mining
- Quarries (biblical)
- Quarry lake
