= Capertee =

- Town
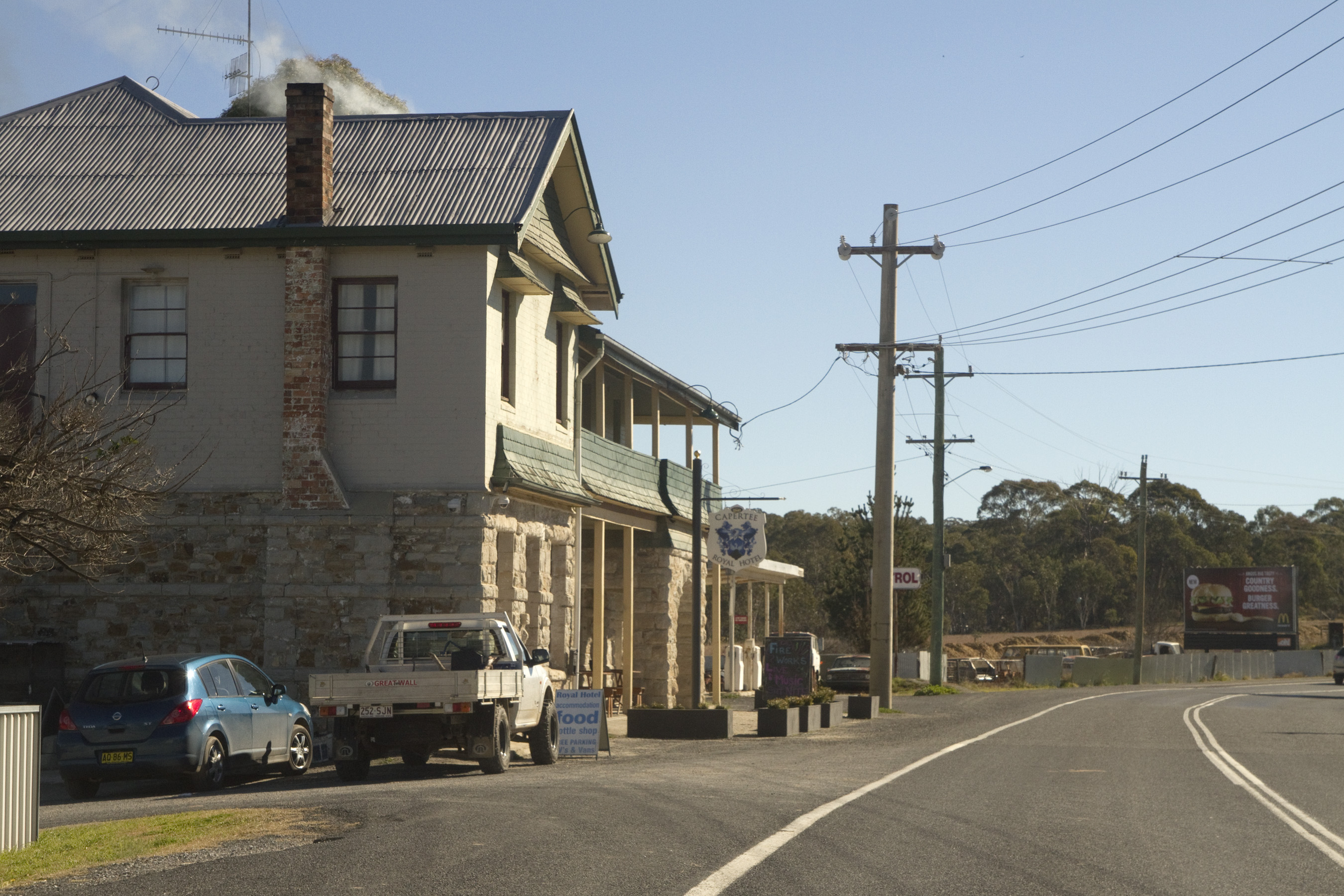
- The Royal Hotel, Capertee.

- Coordinates: 33°09′S 149°59′E
- Country: Australia
- State: New South Wales
- LGA: City of Lithgow
- Location: 186 km (116 mi) WNW of Sydney; 46 km (29 mi) NNW of Lithgow; 81 km (50 mi) SSE of Mudgee

Government
  - State electorate: Bathurst
  - Federal division: Calare
- Elevation: 808 m (2,651 ft)

Population
  - Total: 145 (2016 census)
- Postcode: 2846

Capertee (/keɪpərtiː/ KAY-per-tee) is a village 46 km north of Lithgow, New South Wales, Australia. It is on an elevated site (808 metres) above the Capertee Valley. In 2021, the township had a population of 130 people. The Castlereagh Highway (previously known as the Mudgee Road) links Capertee with Lithgow to the south and Mudgee to the north. The township is surrounded by National Parks and grazing land. Principal employment is in coal mining, farming and tourism-related services. The Capertee Valley forms a part of the catchment area of the Hawkesbury River, but the village lies very close to the Great Divide watershed, with the Turon River catchment nearby to its west.

== History ==
Prior to European settlement, the Capertee district was occupied by the Wiradjuri people.

Early European explorers through the region were James Blackman in 1821, followed later the same year by William Lawson, seeking a practicable pass through the ranges to the pastoral lands to the north-west. By the early 1830s Sir John Jamison, a wealthy colonial landholder, had established a pastoral run of about 18,000 acres in the Capertee Valley. Jamison's cattle station was named ‘Capita’ or 'Capertee' and was operated using convict labour. In March 1834 the stationing of a constable at Capertee was described by a correspondent as “a most inefficient and useless appointment” due to the isolation of the district.

By the 1840s land in the Capertee Valley was opened up for sale and occupation leases, leading to the establishment of a number sheep stations in the valley. After Jamison's death in 1844 the ‘Capertee’ run was briefly leased to Benjamin Boyd (another landholder with extensive colonial holdings). In September 1846 the 'Capertee' leasehold was advertised for sale by auction. In the late 1840s a Mr. Stewart raised horses at Capertee; his ‘Capertee Stud’ was claimed to be “the largest and most perfect horse establishment in the colony”.

In June 1853 a thirty-acre portion of Crown Land was proclaimed to be set aside “near Blackman’s Crown, Mudgee Road” (in Roxburgh county) as a potential town lot.

In April 1856 a letter to the editor claimed “that a promising Gold Field has lately been discovered on the Capertee River”. The writer advised that Capertee “is only accessible in two places, to drays and other vehicles – the one by Dabee [now Rylstone] and the other by the Peak”. Reports of gold discoveries in the Capertee Valley were only occasional and did not lead to gold-rushes of any significance in the district.

=== Capertee Camp ===
In June 1861 John Shervey purchased 33 acres of land “on the road from Mudgee to Sydney, near Blackman’s Crown, lying northerly from M. Corlis’ 30 acres”. The location became known as ‘Capertee Camp’. Shervey erected a building called the Capertee Camp Inn to provide accommodation, food and beverages to travellers along the Sydney to Mudgee road. The first specific mention of the Capertee Camp locality was in newspaper reports of the pursuit and capture of one of the two bushrangers who had robbed the Sydney mail coach in April 1863 at Cherrytree Hill between Bowenfels and Cudgegong. The robbers were pursued by constables Wright and Cleary who finally captured one of the men at “a place called Eli Flat, between Capertee Camp and Freestone’s house”.

In common with many roadside shanties in isolated locations Shervey's Capertee Camp Inn was not licensed but provided alcoholic drinks to travellers. In October 1869 it was reported that Mary Shervey “of Capertee Camp, Mudgee Road” was summoned “for selling spirits without a license”. She was fined £30 “and costs” (which was paid in order to avoid “three months imprisonment in Mudgee Gaol”).

A traveller through the Capertee Valley wrote in August 1877 that the “Capertee Basin” was “composed of shaggy forest, rugged ridges, distant mountain peaks, and bold bluffs of red and gray rocks that would delight the eye of the artist or a lover of the picturesque”.

=== Capertee village ===
The township itself dates from the time of the establishment of the railway station in 1882. The station and nearby station master's residence date from this period while several other extant buildings date from the late 19th and early 20th century. In September 1885 land was set aside for the village of Capertee (county of Roxburgh, parish of Bandamora).

From 1882 Capertee was a temporary terminus of a railway branch line from Wallerawang on the main Western railway line. When the line was extended to Mudgee, there was no flat ground on which to build a crossing loop, so Capertee ended up with an unusual dead-end crossing siding instead. The line still operates although the railway station is closed.

== Amenities ==
Capertee has a public school, police station, bush fire brigade hall, community hall (Progress Hall), public house (Royal Hotel), public telephone, two (rare) fibro constructed churches, and a combined garage/shop/post office. A community market is held on the fourth Sunday of each month at The Royal Capertee Hotel.

== Tourism ==
Capertee is located in an area which is popular with landscape painters, photographers, bird-watchers and walkers. In the US published book Fifty Places to Go Birding Before You Die (2007), author Chris Santella lists Capertee Valley as one of only two locations in Australia selected in his top 50 world bird-watching locations. Bird-watchers are attracted by the diverse birdlife in the area. One 'destination' bird is the rare regent honeyeater (Xanthomyza phrygia). Pearson's Lookout located two kilometres south of the town offers views of Capertee valley.

== See also ==
- Ben Bullen
- Cullen Bullen
- Glen Davis
- Ilford
- Torbane
