= Cullen Bullen =

Village in New South Wales, Australia

- Town
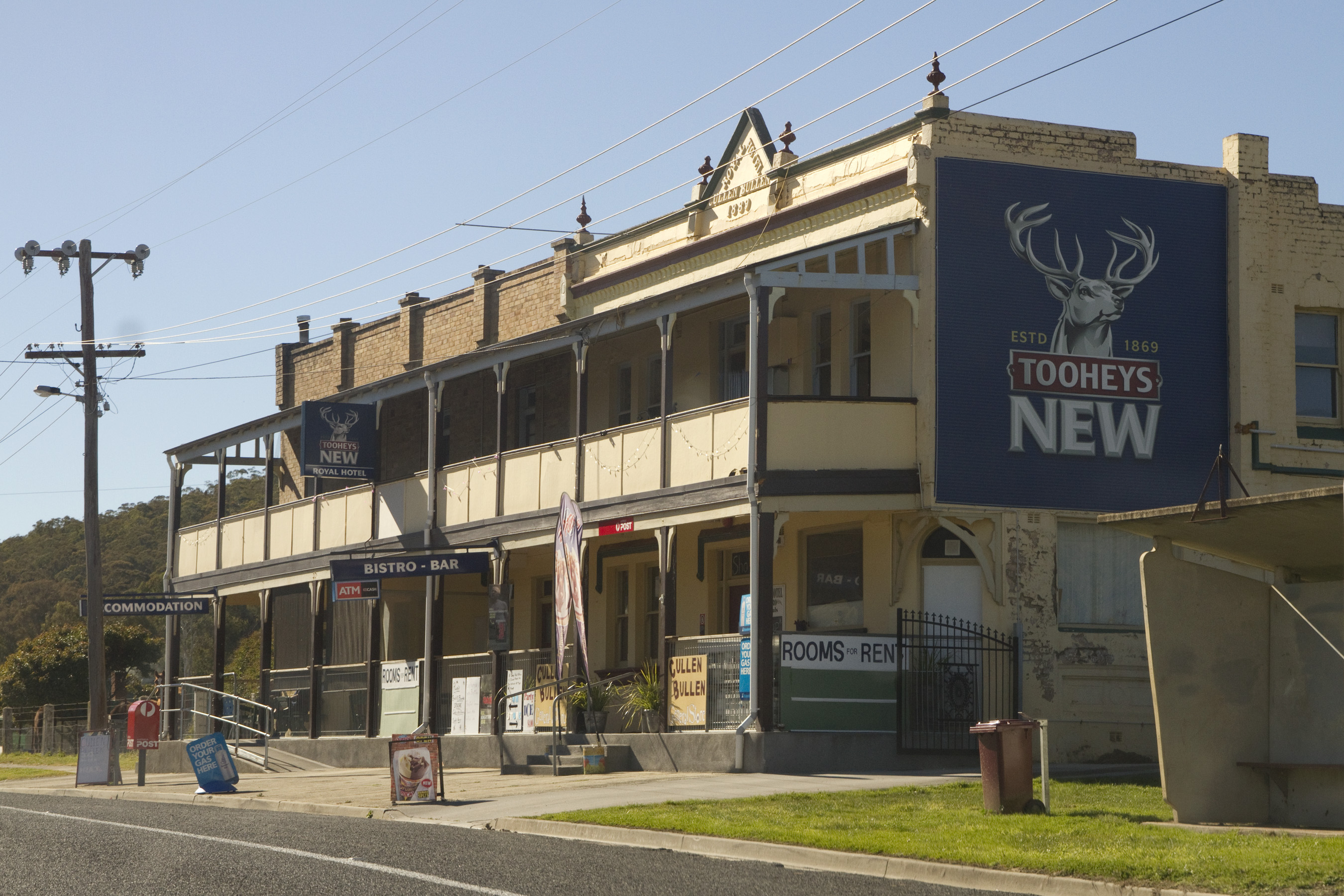
- Royal Hotel, Cullen Bullen, New South Wales.

- Country: Australia
- State: New South Wales
- LGA: City of Lithgow
- Location: 168 km (104 mi) WNW of Sydney; 28 km (17 mi) NNW of Lithgow; 11 km (6.8 mi) S of Ben Bullen; 100 km (62 mi) SSE of Mudgee

Government
  - State electorate: Bathurst
  - Federal division: Calare
- Elevation: 879 m (2,884 ft)

Population
  - Total: 279 (2016 census)
- Postcode: 2790

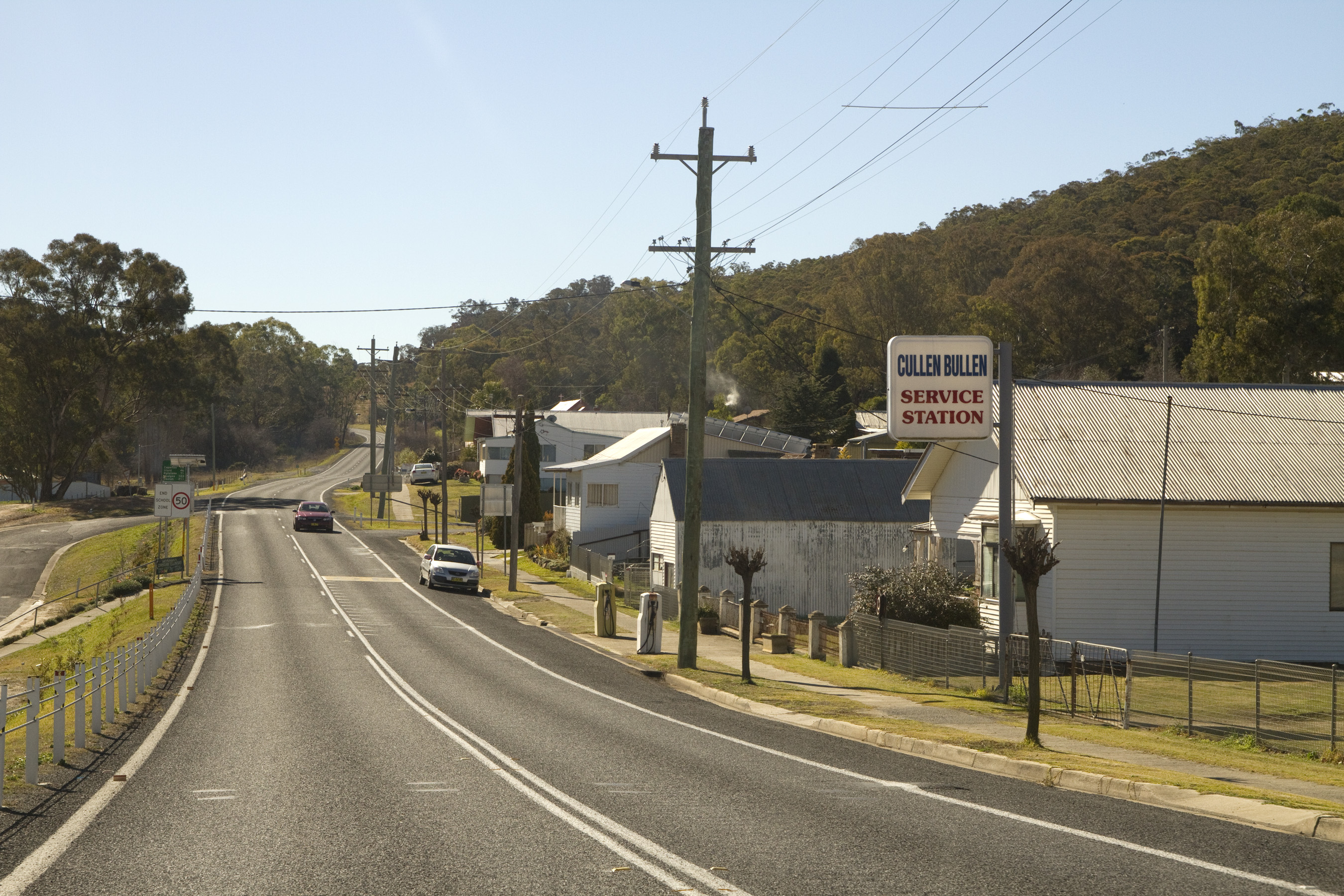
Service station, Cullen Bullen, New South Wales

Cullen Bullen is a village in New South Wales, Australia. It is located on Mudgee Road, 168 km north-west of Sydney, 28 km north of Lithgow. At the 2016 census, Cullen Bullen had a population of 279 people, up from 198 ten years earlier. The Cullen Bullen village is sustained by local mines and the Mount Piper Power Station.

In the language of the Wiradjuri people, who occupied the district prior to white settlement; the word "cullen bullen" is believed to mean "Lyrebird".

The first European in the area was James Blackman, who was surveying a roadway from what is now Wallerawang to Mudgee, in 1821. Blackman was followed in 1822 by William Lawson and later Allan Cunningham in 1822–23.

Robert Dulhunty – the subsequent founder of Dubbo – took up the first land grant in the area in 1828. He built a homestead on land which now lies on the back road from Cullen Bullen to Portland.

By 1861 the post office opened at Cullen Bullen, and the school in 1875. The school moved to its current site in 1895.
