= List of quarries in the United States =

This is a list of notable quarries and areas of quarrying in the United States. A number of these are historic quarries listed on the National Register of Historic Places (NRHP), ranging from relatively ancient archeological sites to places having pre-World War II activity. This includes major areas of continuing, modern quarrying.

According to Marble.com, in 2016 there were 276 quarries producing natural stone in 34 states, and states producing the most granite were Texas, Massachusetts, Indiana, Wisconsin, and Georgia. The term "quarry" refers also to sites producing aggregate, molding sand, or other resources besides cut stone.

There were numerous more quarries in the U.S. during the 1800s and 1900s than are operational now. In Oregon, a state with much less activity than Vermont and other bigger quarrying states, there were more than 250 quarries operational at one time or another. In 1906 the state mineralogist of California reported on 52 granite quarrying areas in 17 counties.

Many quarries were opened temporarily to provide stone for one or a few local or regional construction projects, but could not compete later when railroads allowed for economical transportation of heavy building materials to the area. Quarrying spurred the construction of railways and vice versa, from the 1826 construction of the Granite Railway in Massachusetts to the modern day.

== Quarries in the U.S. ==
Quarries in the United States, former and current, include:

=== Arizona ===
Cochise Marble Company, Bowie, Arizona, on-site quarrying, blocks, aggregates, calcium carbonate 99.5%, established 1908 in the Chiricahua Mountains; colors: white, grey, black, blue

=== Arkansas ===
- Lake Catherine Quarry, Malvern, Arkansas, NRHP-listed
- Ozark Southern Stone quarry, Elk Ranch, Arkansas, rich in dolomite limestone. Opened in 1883 as Eureka Stone Co.

=== California ===
- Chile Bar Slate company quarry, off of highway CA193 next to the American River near Placerville, California
- Limestone quarry near Auburn, California of the Mountain Quarries Company of San Francisco, a subsidiary of Pacific Portland Cement Company, near confluence of the North Fork and the Middle Fork of the American River. Served by Mountain Quarries Bridge (1912), NRHP-listed.
- Stringfellow Acid Pits a former rock quarry in Jurupa Valley in Riverside County, California, which became a toxic waste dump and later a Superfund site. Deemed one of the most polluted sites in California in 1980s, and associated with mismanagement and scandal in the U.S. Environmental Protection Agency.
- California Granite Company, Rocklin, California, NRHP-listed granite quarry with historic structures.
- Permanente Quarry, in Santa Clara County, California, a limestone and aggregate quarry and cement plant
- Griffith Quarry, Penryn, California, NRHP-listed
- North Chuckwalla Mountain Quarry District, near Desert Center, California, NRHP-listed. An address-restricted archeological site in Riverside County, California

=== Colorado ===
- Aberdeen Quarry, an abandoned granite quarry in Gunnison County, Colorado. Its granite was used in construction of the Colorado State Capitol
- Marble, Colorado, only site of Yule Marble quarrying, in the West Elk Mountains. 99.5% pure calcite, discovered in 1873, source of marble for the Tomb of the Unknowns and for the exterior of the Lincoln Memorial

=== Connecticut ===
- Norcross Brothers Granite Quarry, Branford, Connecticut, NRHP-listed
- Portland Brownstone Quarries, Portland, Connecticut, NRHP-listed, source of much of the brownstone used in New York City, Boston, Philadelphia
- Luman Andrews House, Southington, Connecticut, NRHP-listed. Identified in 1825 to be a site of blue limestone, suitable for making Portland cement, which previously had to be imported from England
- New England Cement Company Kiln and Quarry, Woodbridge, Connecticut, NRHP-listed

=== Florida ===
- Cemex Miami SCL Aggregates Quarry, Miami, Florida, source of limestone
- Spanish Coquina Quarries, St. Augustine Beach, Florida, NRHP-listed, source of coquina

=== Georgia ===
- Burns Quarry, near Carrollton, Georgia, NRHP-listed. Address-restricted archeological site, NRHP-listed in Carroll County
- Stone Mountain, Georgia, site of granite quarrying from the 1830s. Its granite was used in the locks of the Panama Canal and in steps to the U.S. Capitol building. The mountain is known for its Confederate memorial carving started by Gutzon Borglum and for association with the Ku Klux Klan revival in 1916.

=== Hawaii ===
- Mauna Kea Adz Quarry, Hilo, Hawaii, NRHP-listed

=== Idaho ===
- Harvey Mountain Quarry, Bonners Ferry, Idaho, NRHP-listed

=== Illinois ===
- Thornton Quarry, just south of Chicago, Illinois. One of the largest aggregate quarries in the world, 1.5 miles (2.4 km) long, 0.5 miles wide, and up to 450 feet deep, site of a Silurian reef. Quarried since 1836. The quarry also acts as an emergency flood control reservoir as part of Chicago Deep Tunnel project.

=== Indiana ===
- Marengo warehouse, in Marengo, Indiana, formerly a limestone quarry, now one of the largest subterranean storage facilities in the nation, with nearly 4,000,000 square feet (370,000 m^{2}) space. It began as an open pit quarry in 1886 due in part to its proximity to a railroad. Underground room and pillar mining began in 1936. Leased storage began in 1986. Used by the U.S. Department of Defense for storage of 10,000,000 MRE meals, by Bridgestone for storage of 400,000 tires, and by Controlled Pharming Ventures for growing tomatoes and corn.

Indiana is the Limestone Capital of the world. Many quarries are located in southern Indiana, including The Empire Quarry, which supplied stone for The Empire State Building. Oolitic Indiana is home to Indiana Limestone Corporation, the longest operating stone quarry in the United States.

=== Iowa ===
- State Quarry, Iowa Men's Reformatory, Anamosa, Iowa, NRHP-listed, includes a quarry
- T.J. Gipple's stone quarry, near NRHP-listed Gipple's Quarry Bridge (1893), Columbus Junction, Iowa
- Old State Quarry, North Liberty, Iowa, NRHP-listed
- Quarry, Iowa, site of limestone quarrying in Marshall County, Iowa. Town was laid out by Le Grand Quarry Company in 1868. Nearby Quarry Bridge, in Marshalltown, Iowa, is NRHP-listed.
- Stone City, Iowa, site of Anamosa Limestone quarrying

=== Kansas ===
- Quarry Creek Archeological Site, Leavenworth, Kansas, NRHP-listed, a large archeological site of the prehistoric Kansas City Hopewell culture
- Dennis Quarry, near Onaga, Kansas, NRHP-listed. Address-restricted; a prehistoric lithic quarry (PDF)

=== Kentucky ===
- Mega Cavern, a cavern in Louisville, Kentucky created by limestone quarrying over 42 years during the middle of the 20th century. Deemed the largest building in the state, it has 4,000,000 square feet (370,000 m^{2}) and is now used for tourism including zip lines, for storage and other business.

=== Maine ===
- Willard Brook Quarry, in Piscataquis County, Maine, near Chisuncook, Maine, NRHP-listed
- Franklin, Maine, granite quarries, in one of which the NRHP-listed Robertson Quarry Galamander, a customized wagon for stone, was found.

=== Maryland ===
- Beaver Dam, Maryland, a now "flooded marble quarry in Cockeysville, Maryland, that has been used as a swimming location since the 1930s. Source of dolomitic marble known specifically as Cockeysville Marble for the Washington Monument in Washington, D.C. and many other purposes in the eastern U.S.
- Greenspring Quarry, now a lake, Pikesville, Maryland
- Heath Farm Jasper Quarry Archeological Site, Elkton, Maryland, NRHP-listed
- Iron Hill Cut Jasper Quarry Archeological Site, Elkton, Maryland, NRHP-listed
- Magothy Quartzite Quarry Archeological Site, Pasadena, Maryland, NRHP-listed, Quartzite and sandstone quarries of the Woodland period
- Seneca Quarry, Seneca, Maryland, NRHP-listed, source of Seneca red sandstone used in two Potomac River canals: the Potowmack Canal (opened in 1802, and officially known as the Great Falls Skirting Canal) on the Virginia side of Great Falls; and the C&O Canal.
- Broad Creek Soapstone Quarries, Whiteford, Maryland, NRHP-listed, active from 1700 to 1000 B.C

=== Massachusetts ===
- Fall River quarrying, Fall River, Massachusetts, source of granite for many of 39 textile mill complexes and other local buildings, both before and after 1843 fire.
- Massachusetts Hornfels-Braintree Slate Quarry, Milton and Quincy, Massachusetts, NRHP-listed, archaeological site used from 7,000 B.P. until the early 17th century as a source of slate and hornfels used for chipped and ground tools.
- W.N. Flynt Granite Co., in Monson, Massachusetts, a granite quarry that opened in 1809 and operated until 1935. By 1888, the company employed over 200 workers, and produced about 30,000 tons of granite per year.
- Quincy Quarries Reservation, in Quincy, Massachusetts, producer of granite from 1826 to 1963, including for the Bunker Hill Monument. Site of the Granite Railway, often credited as the first commercial railroad in the United States
- Fletcher Granite Company, operated a granite quarry that opened in 1881 in Westford, Massachusetts, and in 2009 it owned a quarry in Milford, New Hampshire.

=== Michigan ===
- Green Quarry Site, Mears, Michigan, NRHP-listed, "the only known source of Lambrix chert"
- Pewangoing Quarry, Norwood Township, Michigan, NRHP-listed, site of tool-making from Early Archaic period through Late Woodland period
- Calcite Limestone Quarry, Rogers City, Michigan, the largest limestone quarry in the world, now owned by Carmeuse and operated as Carmeuse Calcite Operations. Limestone was first mined here in 1912 and continues through the present.

=== Minnesota ===
- Clark and McCormack Quarry and House, Rockville, Minnesota, NRHP-listed. Established in 1907, was the source of Rockville Pink granite.
- Grand Meadow Quarry Archeological District, Grand Meadow, Minnesota, NRHP-listed. Site of pre-historic chert mining.
- Jasper Stone Company and Quarry, Jasper, Minnesota, NRHP-listed. Quarry established c. 1890, an early regional source of Sioux Quartzite for construction, and since World War I a leading international producer of silicon dioxide for industrial abrasives.
- Louis Hultgren House and Sand Pit, Kerrick, Minnesota, NRHP-listed. A molding sand quarry.
- Pipestone National Monument, in southwestern Minnesota, near Pipestone, Minnesota, site of quarrying for catlinite, also known as "pipestone", used by Plains Indians to make ceremonial pipes
- Kettle River Sandstone Company Quarry, Sandstone, Minnesota, NRHP-listed
- Coldspring (company), founded originally as Rockville Granite Company to exploit granite from Rockville, Minnesota, moved in 1920, to the town of Cold Spring, Minnesota and becoming the Cold Spring Granite Company. The company became the largest quarrier in the country by 1930. It now has quarries and works in Minnesota, New York, South Dakota, Texas, California and Canada.

=== Missouri ===
- Crescent Quarry Archeological Site, Crescent, Missouri, NRHP-listed
- Beaumont-Tyson Quarry District, St. Louis and Times Beach, Missouri, NRHP-listed, archeological sites

=== Montana ===
- California Creek Quarry, Anaconda, Montana, NRHP-listed
- West Quincy Granite Quarry, Square Butte, Montana, NRHP-listed

=== Nebraska ===
- Nehawka Flint Quarries, Nehawka, Nebraska, NRHP-listed

=== New Jersey ===
- M.C. Mulligan & Sons Quarry, Clinton, New Jersey, NRHP-listed, complex of three limestone quarries
- Houdaille Quarry, a quarry of basalt in the Watchung Mountains, in Union County, New Jersey. It began as the Commonwealth Quarry in early 1900s.

=== New York ===
- Dutchess Quarry Cave Site, Goshen, NY, NRHP-listed, "in the Town of Goshen in Orange County, New York. It is midway between the village of Goshen and Florida, at the junction of NY 17A and Quarry Road (Orange County Route 68), built into the side of a 580-foot (177 m) hill known as Mount Lookout. In the 1960s, archaeologists digging at the site found caves with artifacts left by hunter-gatherers 12,000 years ago, during the last Ice Age. A Paleo-Indian fluted point, a very rare stone tool, was among them.[1] At the time of its discovery it was the oldest such site east of the Mississippi.[2] The site has been at the center of a battle between local archaeologists and the Pleasant Valley-based Dutchess Quarry and Supply Company, which actively produces dolomite gravel on the site."
- Tuckahoe, New York, in Westchester County, first site of large-scale quarrying of Tuckahoe marble, also known as Inwood and Westchester marble, found in southern New York state and western Connecticut as part of the Inwood Formation
- Walcott–Rust quarry, in Herkimer County near Russia, New York, a fossil quarry whose fossils supported the first definitive description of trilobites' soft appendages.

=== North Carolina ===
- Mount Airy, North Carolina, known as "The Granite City", and site of NRHP-listed North Carolina Granite Corporation Quarry Complex, "the world's largest open faced granite quarry". It has been quarried since 1743 by the North Carolina Granite Corporation and predecessors.
- The granite quarry for which Granite Quarry, North Carolina is named, and source of stone for Granite Quarry School, NRHP-listed, https://files.nc.gov/ncdcr/nr/RW0927.pdf and map and Michael Braun House, also NRHP-listed. See https://files.nc.gov/ncdcr/nr/RW0001.pdf.

=== North Dakota ===
- Lynch Quarry Site, North Dakota, NRHP-listed and a U.S. National Historic Landmark, a flint quarry that was "a major source of flint found at archaeological sites across North America, and it has been estimated that the material was mined there from 11,000 B.C. to A.D. 1600."

=== Ohio ===
- Zimmerman Kame, NRHP-listed glacial kame and archaeological site in McDonald Township, Hardin County, Ohio, was a commercial gravel pit ending in the 1970s
- Dravo Gravel Site, an archeological site with artifacts from the Archaic period above the Great Miami River in Miami Township, Hamilton County, Ohio, located in what is now a gravel pit
- McDonald Farm (Xenia, Ohio), NRHP-listed, whose quarry supplied stone for the Washington Monument.
- Owens Quarry, a limestone quarry and crusher plant near Marion, Ohio, around which the community of Owens, Ohio grew.
- Ridgeway Site, in Hardin County, Ohio, a former archaeological site which, during excavation of its gravel, yielded numerous artifacts and buried bodies of the Glacial Kame culture, for which it is the type site.

=== Pennsylvania ===
- Carbaugh Run Rhyolite Quarry Site (36AD30), Cashtown, Pennsylvania, NRHP-listed, in Franklin Township, Adams County, Pennsylvania
- Quarries of the Hummelstown Brownstone Company, Derry Township, Pennsylvania, NRHP-listed
- Tudek Site, near State College in Centre County, Pennsylvania, NRHP-listed archaeological site used as a jasper stone quarry in prehistory
- Thomas Marble Quarry Houses, West Whiteland, Pennsylvania, NRHP-listed, includes quarry site and the "Quarry Master's House and two worker's houses", which are all stuccoed stone structures.
- Slatington, Pennsylvania, center of the Pennsylvania slate quarrying industry

=== Rhode Island ===
- Ochee Spring Quarry, Johnston, Rhode Island, NRHP-listed, "a source of steatite (soapstone), a relatively soft stone easily workable into containers. Native Americans are known to have used this quarry.[2] A study of the site conducted in the mid-1980s concluded that the quarry was probably worked in an organized manner, to produce containers in a variety of size. Items made from this quarry have been found across southern New England."

=== South Carolina ===
- Red Bluff Flint Quarries, Allendale, South Carolina, NRHP-listed, pre-historic source of marine chert or flint
- Allendale Chert Quarries Archeological District, Martin, South Carolina, NRHP-listed
- Civilian Conservation Corps Quarry No. 1 and Truck Trail, Pickens, South Carolina, NRHP-listed, one of four quarry sites used in the CCC construction of Table Rock State Park structures and facilities between 1935 and 1941.
- Civilian Conservation Corps Quarry No. 2, Pickens, South Carolina, NRHP-listed, another one of the four quarry sites
- Nesbitt's Limestone Quarry (38CK69), Gaffney, South Carolina, NRHP-listed, "the most extensive and best preserved limestone quarry associated with early iron production in the northwestern Piedmont of South Carolina. It was the primary source of limestone for the region's ironworks."

=== South Dakota ===
- Flint Hill Aboriginal Quartzite Quarry, Edgemont, South Dakota, NRHP-listed

=== Tennessee ===
- Dover Flint Quarries, Dover, Tennessee, NRHP-listed
- John J. Craig Quarry Historic District, Friendsville, Tennessee, NRHP-listed

=== Texas ===
- Alibates Flint Quarries National Monument, Fritch, Texas, NRHP-listed
- Uvalde Flint Quarry, Uvalde, Texas, NRHP-listed
- Champion Stone Company, Lueder's Limestone quarry mining from the Lueders Basin outside Abilene, Texas with more than 100 years of Limestone reserves, 14 harvestable layers of limestone and over 12 color options.
- Tubb Quarry, a shotrock limestone quarry located on the Big Spring Mesa approximately 10 miles south of Big Spring, Texas.
- Davis Wetzel Rock Quarry, Lubbock, Texas
- AJ Brauer, Jarrel, Texas

=== Utah ===
- Dinosaur National Monument, Utah, a dinosaur quarry, whose Quarry Visitor Center, is NRHP-listed
- Wildhorse Canyon Obsidian Quarry, in Beaver County, Utah near Milford, Utah, NRHP-listed. An archaeological site which is the only known obsidian flow in Utah used by prehistoric peoples as a source of raw materials.

=== Vermont ===
- E. L. Smith Quarry, in or near Graniteville, Vermont and Barre, Vermont. This is the world's largest "deep hole" granite quarry. It produces Devonian Barre granite. Graniteville is home of its owner, the 1885-founded Rock of Ages Corporation, since 2016 part of Polycor, Inc., the largest producer of marble and granite in North America. Quarrying continues, and the quarry may be visited by the public.

=== Virginia ===
- Public Quarry at Government Island, Stafford, Virginia, NRHP-listed, "the principal source of Aquia Creek sandstone, a building stone used in many of the early government buildings in Washington, D.C., including the U.S. Capitol and the White House.
- Frazier Quarry, company founded in 1915 as Betts Quarry and based in Harrisonburg, Virginia in the Shenandoah Valley. The company is the only producer of Shenandoah Valley Bluestone (limestone)
- Big Run Quarry Site, near Luray, Virginia, NRHP-listed, an archaeological site in Shenandoah National Park.
- Thunderbird Archaeological District and Jasper quarry, near Limeton, Virginia, is an archaeological district described as consisting of "three sites—Thunderbird Site, the Fifty Site, and the Fifty Bog. It is located in Warren County Virginia, near modern-day Front Royal, in the Shenandoah River Valley.

=== Washington ===
- Basalt Cobblestone Quarries District, Ridgefield, Washington, NRHP-listed
- Tenino Stone Company Quarry, Tenino, Washington, NRHP-listed
- Walker Cut Stone Company, Wilkerson, Washington, NRHP-listed

=== Wisconsin ===
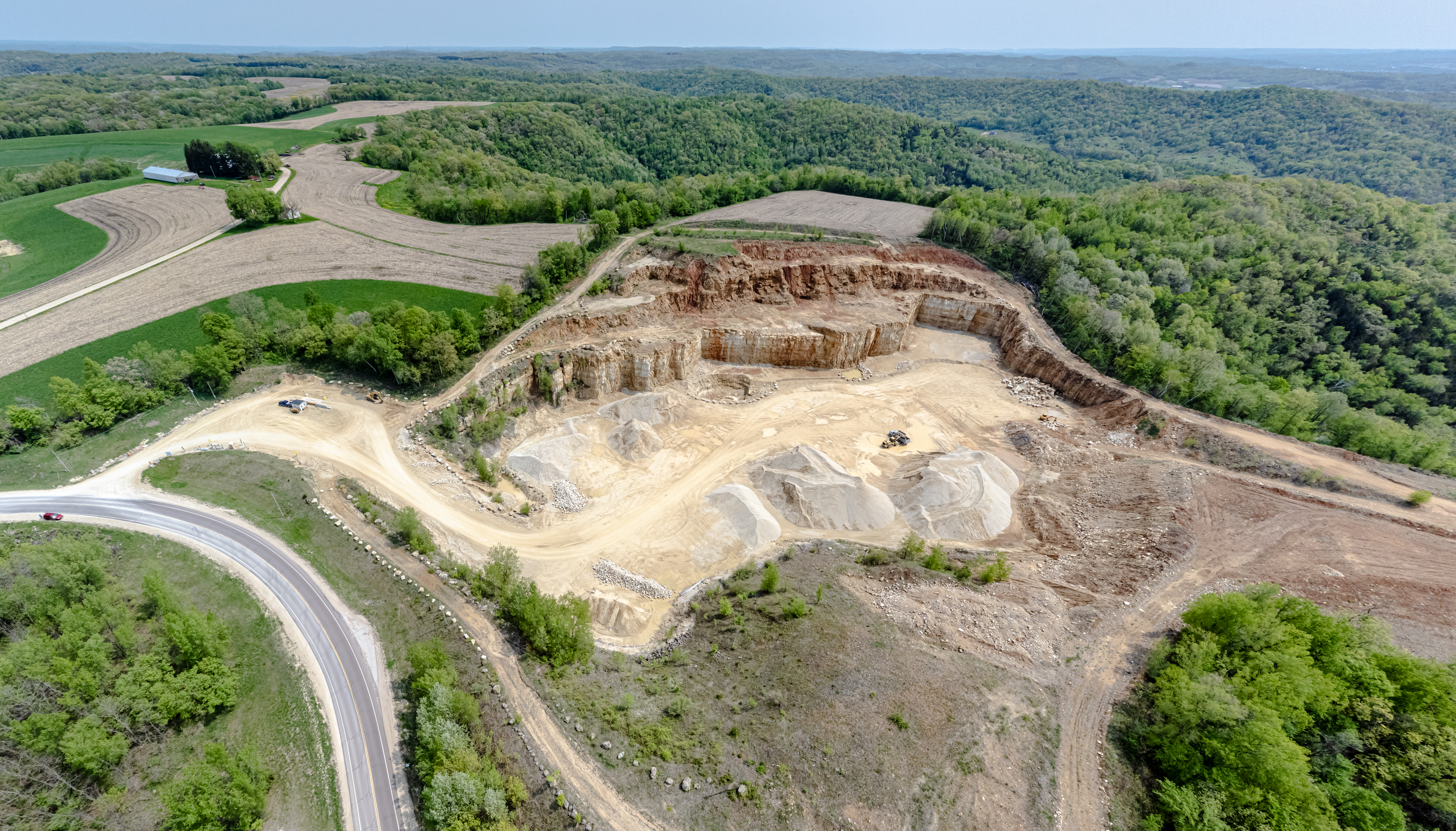
Rock quarry in West Salem Romskog Quarry A triple homicide in 2021 took place at this quarry

- Barron County Pipestone Quarry, near Doyle, Wisconsin or Rice Lake, Wisconsin, NRHP-listed. "Several tribes have used rock from the quarry to create ceremonial pipes. Historically, various tribes would travel long distances to acquire the special red-colored stone found in the quarry.[2] A widespread legend among the tribes is that the stone gets its color from the flesh and blood of their ancestors."
- Bass Island Brownstone Company Quarry, in Lake Superior, near La Pointe, WI, NRHP-listed. Source of brownstone for buildings in Chicago, IL and Milwaukee, WI
- Walczak-Wontor Quarry Pit Workshop, near Cataract, Wisconsin, NRHP-listed. Address-restricted archeological site.
- Krukowski Quarry, a sandstone quarry near Mosinee, Wisconsin. It yields late Cambrian period fossils, in the course of quarrying rock slabs for countertops and other purposes.
- Quasius Quarry, in Rhine, Wisconsin near the Sheboygan River, NRHP-listed. A limestone quarry and lime kilns for producing quicklime, built in 1911 and abandoned in the 1920s.

=== American Samoa ===
- Lau'agae Ridge Quarry, Tula, AS, NRHP-listed, "a prehistoric stone quarry on the eastern side of the island of Tutuila in the United States territory of American Samoa"
- Tataga-Matau Fortified Quarry Complex (AS-34-10), near the village of Leone on Tutuila in American Samoa, NRHP-listed, "a complex consisting of a series of basalt quarries and structures that archaeologists have interpreted as having a military defensive purpose. The site has been known since at least 1927, and was first formally surveyed in the 1960s. Features of the site include extraction pits, from which basalt was quarried for the manufacture of stone tools and weapons, as well as domestic features such as grinding stones. Archaeologists in 1985 noted that some of the sites features were, including trenches and terracing, were made in areas that were unsuitable for the production of stone tools, and closely resemble known military defensive structures in other areas of the Samoan islands.

=== Marianas ===
- Rota Latte Stone Quarry, MP, NRHP-listed, also known as the As Nieves quarry, located near the Chamorro village of Sinapalo on the island of Rota in the Marianas Islands. The prehistoric megaliths found there are believed to have been used as foundation pillars for houses." Is this same or different than the source of stone pillars for House of Taga on Tinian island?

== See also ==
- List of quarries (worldwide)
- List of lime kilns in the United States, many of which were near limestone quarries
