= List of lime kilns in the United States =

This is a list of lime kilns in the United States.

A number of historic lime kilns are individually listed on the National Register of Historic Places (NRHP), while others are included as contributing structures in NRHP-listed historic districts or other NRHP listings. The list also includes lime kilns which are listed in local or state historic registers, and ones not registered at all.

== Lime kilns in the United States ==
These include:

- Chewacla, Alabama
- Olema Lime Kilns, Olema, California, NRHP-listed
- Henry Cowell Redwoods State Park and Cowell Lime Works, California
- Rose Lime Kiln, Lake City, Colorado, NRHP-listed
- Sharon Valley Historic District, in Sharon, Connecticut, a small community which grew an iron mining and refining operation during the late 19th century, including a lime kiln
- Eastburn-Jeanes Lime Kilns Historic District, Newark, Delaware, NRHP-listed
- Orofino Historic District, Orofino, Idaho, NRHP-listed, which includes several lime kilns.
- Buffalo Grove Lime Kiln, Polo, Illinois, NRHP-listed, built 1870
- Griggsville Landing Lime Kiln, Valley City, IL, NRHP-listed
- Delphi Lime Kilns, Delphi, Indiana, NRHP-listed
- National Register of Historic Places listings in Clark County, Indiana
  - Mitchell P. Howes' Lime Kiln and Quarry, Utica Township, Clark County, Indiana
  - Samuel Starkweather's Lime Kiln and Quarry, Utica Township, Clark County, Indiana
  - Moses H. Tyler Company Lime Kiln and Quarry No. 1, Utica Township, Clark County, Indiana
- Birdsall Lime Kiln, Decorah, Iowa, NRHP-listed
- Rockland, Maine, including NRHP-listed Rockland Residential Historic District and NRHP-listed Main Street Historic District (Rockland, Maine), had numerous lime kilns along its shore. Seven early 19th-century lime kilns survive in NRHP-listed Rockport Historic Kiln Area.
- Thomaston, Maine
- Harris Farm (Walkersville, Maryland)
- List of Michigan State Historic Sites
- Grey Cloud Lime Kiln, Cottage Grove, Minnesota, NRHP-listed
- G. A. Carlson Lime Kiln, Red Wing, Minnesota, NRHP-listed
- Mississippi Lime Kiln, Ste. Genevieve, Missouri
- Woral C. Smith Lime Kiln and Limestone House, Fairbury, Nebraska, NRHP-listed
- Fort Atkinson (Nebraska)
- Moses Craig Lime Kilns, Peapack-Gladstone, New Jersey, NRHP-listed
- Stillwater Township, New Jersey
- Washington Valley Historic District, in Morris Township and Mendham Township, both in Morris County, New Jersey. Includes one or more lime kilns.
- Frey House, at Palatine Bridge in Montgomery County, New York, NRHP-listed. House built in 1808, and 19th-century lime kiln.
- Peter Houghtaling Farm and Lime Kiln, West Coxsackie, New York, NRHP-listed
- Powell–Trollinger Lime Kilns, at Catawba, Catawba County, North Carolina, NRHP-listed. Three lime kilns built about 1865, built into the side of a hill behind a solid stone wall, 20 to 30 feet high. Operated into the next century.
- Levan Farm, a historic house and farm complex in Exeter Township, Berks County, Pennsylvania, NRHP-listed. Includes lime kilns.
- Poole Forge at Narvon, Caernarvon Township, Lancaster County, Pennsylvania, a NRHP-listed district with an iron forge complex, including ruins of a lime kiln.
- Thomas Marble Quarry Houses, in West Whiteland Township, Chester County, Pennsylvania, NRHP-listed. Includes ruins of two lime kilns.
- Isaac A. Packer Farm, Woodward Township, Clinton County, Pennsylvania, NRHP-listed. Historic home and farm complex including a lime kiln.
- Wrightsville Historic District, in Wrightsville, York County, Pennsylvania. Includes lime kilns.
- Lime Kilns (Lincoln, Rhode Island), NRHP-listed
- Lime Rock, Rhode Island
- Sherwood, Tennessee
- Belger-Cahill Lime Kiln, San Marcos, Texas, NRHP-listed
- Denver and Rio Grande Lime Kiln, Cleveland, Utah, NRHP-listed
- Lime Kilns (Eureka, Utah), NRHP-listed
- Jens Larson Jenson Lime Kiln, Richfield, Utah, NRHP-listed
- Eagle Rock, Virginia
- Lime Kiln Point State Park, San Juan Island, Washington, NRHP-listed lighthouse
- Roche Harbor, Washington
- Godey Lime Kilns, Washington, D.C., NRHP-listed
- Potomac Mills (Shepherdstown, West Virginia)
- Milwaukee Falls Lime Company, Grafton, Wisconsin, NRHP-listed
- Trimborn Farm, Greendale, Wisconsin, NRHP-listed. Site of four lime kilns.
- Hurstville Historic District, near Maquoketa, Iowa, an area of a lime manufacturing works, including four kilns, the first built in 1871. The Maquoketa and Hurstville Railroad was organized in 1888 to ship the burned lime instead of hauling it by wagon.
- Garwin Mace Lime Kilns, Menomonee Falls, Wisconsin, NRHP-listed
- Quasius Quarry, near the Sheboygan River in Rhine, Wisconsin, NRHP-listed as the Sheboygan Valley Land and Lime Company. Includes a limestone quarry and kilns for producing quicklime, built in 1911 and abandoned in the 1920s.
- William Johnston Lime Kiln, Saylesville, Wisconsin, NRHP-listed
- Hadfield Company Lime Kilns, Waukesha, Wisconsin, NRHP-listed
- List of historical markers in Kewaunee County, Wisconsin
- Limekiln State Park, Big Sur, California
- Quarry Limekiln, Tennessee

== See also ==
- List of lime kilns (worldwide)
- List of quarries in the United States
