= Clark and McCormack Quarry and House =

Historic house in Minnesota, United States

- U.S. National Register of Historic Places
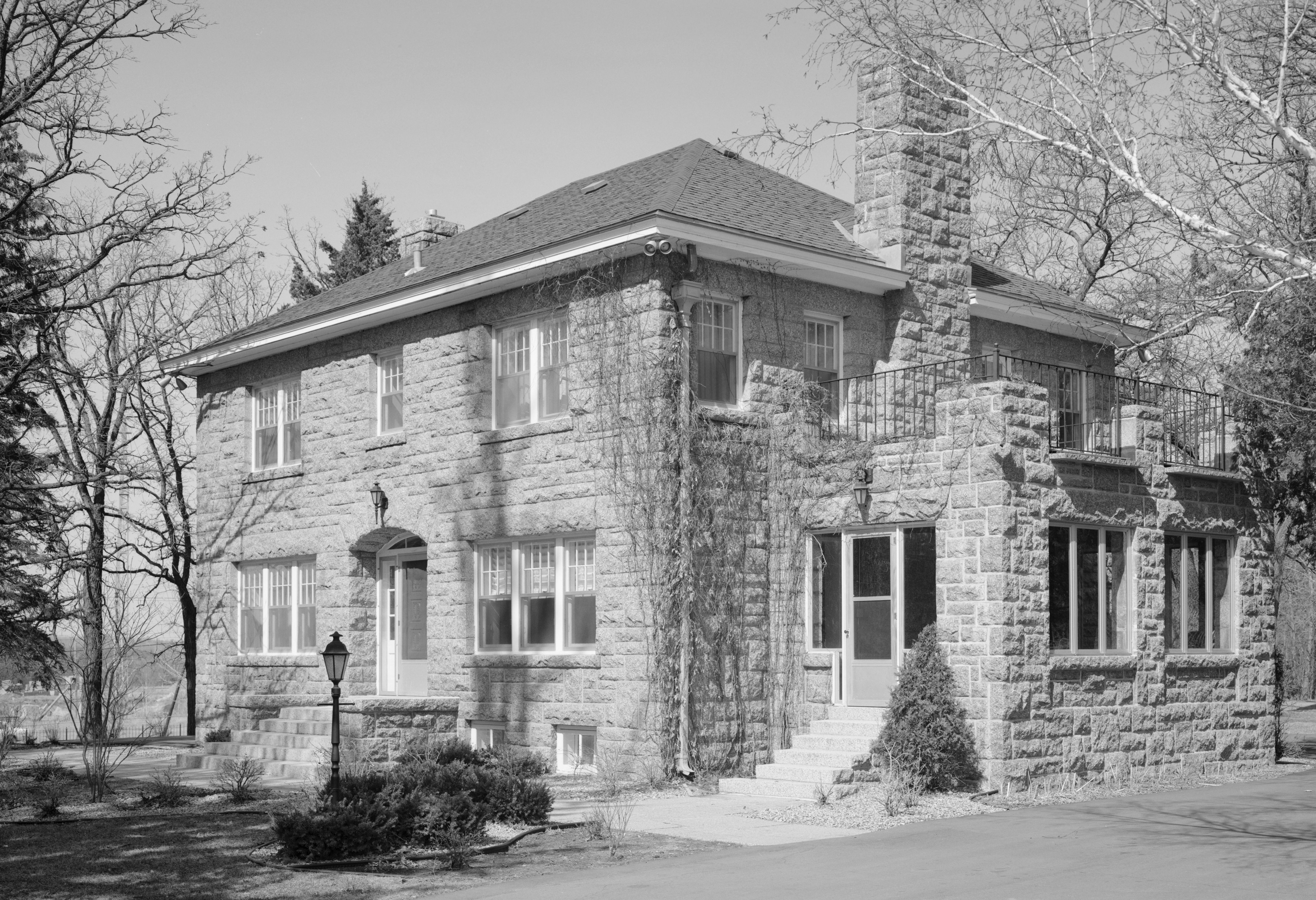
- The John Clark House viewed from the south

- Location within Minnesota Location within the United States
- Location: Minnesota State Highway 23 at Pine Street, Rockville, Minnesota
- Coordinates: 45°28′24″N 94°20′3″W
- Area: 12 acres (4.9 ha)
- Built: 1907 (quarry), 1924 (house)
- Architect: John Gordon Clark
- Architectural style: Colonial Revival
- MPS: Stearns County MRA
- NRHP reference No.: 82003046
- Added to NRHP: April 15, 1982

The Clark and McCormack Quarry and House consists of a historic quarry and the adjacent residential estate of one of the owners in Rockville, Minnesota, United States. The Clark and McCormack Quarry was established in 1907, and was the source of Rockville Pink granite. The John Clark House was built in 1924 with granite from the quarry. The property was listed on the National Register of Historic Places in 1980 for its local significance in the theme of industry. It was nominated for being one of Minnesota's major producers of structural granite and the best representative of eastern Stearns County's important granite quarrying industry.

== Description ==
The site of the Clark and McCormack Quarry was originally a 1-acre (0.40 ha) dome of granite rising above the surrounding land. Once the exposed rock was removed, quarrying continued below ground, leaving the pit that is visible today. The granite is coarsely but evenly grained, with unusually large feldspar crystals that give the stone a glittering, pinkish-grey finish when polished. The deposit is also unusually uniform in its color and texture, with widely spaced joints that allowed for the cutting of massive blocks. The Clark and McCormack has an exceptionally small waste heap compared to most other quarries because so much of its stone was usable.

In the early 20th century, handcarts on tracks were used to transport rough blocks to shops on the periphery of the quarry for finishing. No historic buildings or structures remain around the quarry itself. The operation's early buildings were all demolished as the pit was enlarged, and a few cutting sheds that survived longer were lost to a fire. To the south, however, across Minnesota State Highway 23, stands the John Clark House. It is a two-story rectangular building with a single-story sunporch on one side. The entrance is centered on the wider, west-facing façade. The house has a hip roof with chimneys at either end. The walls are built of rusticated granite from the quarry.

The property includes a detached three-stall garage at its southwest corner. Its design closely matches the house, with stone walls, a hip roof, and its own chimney.

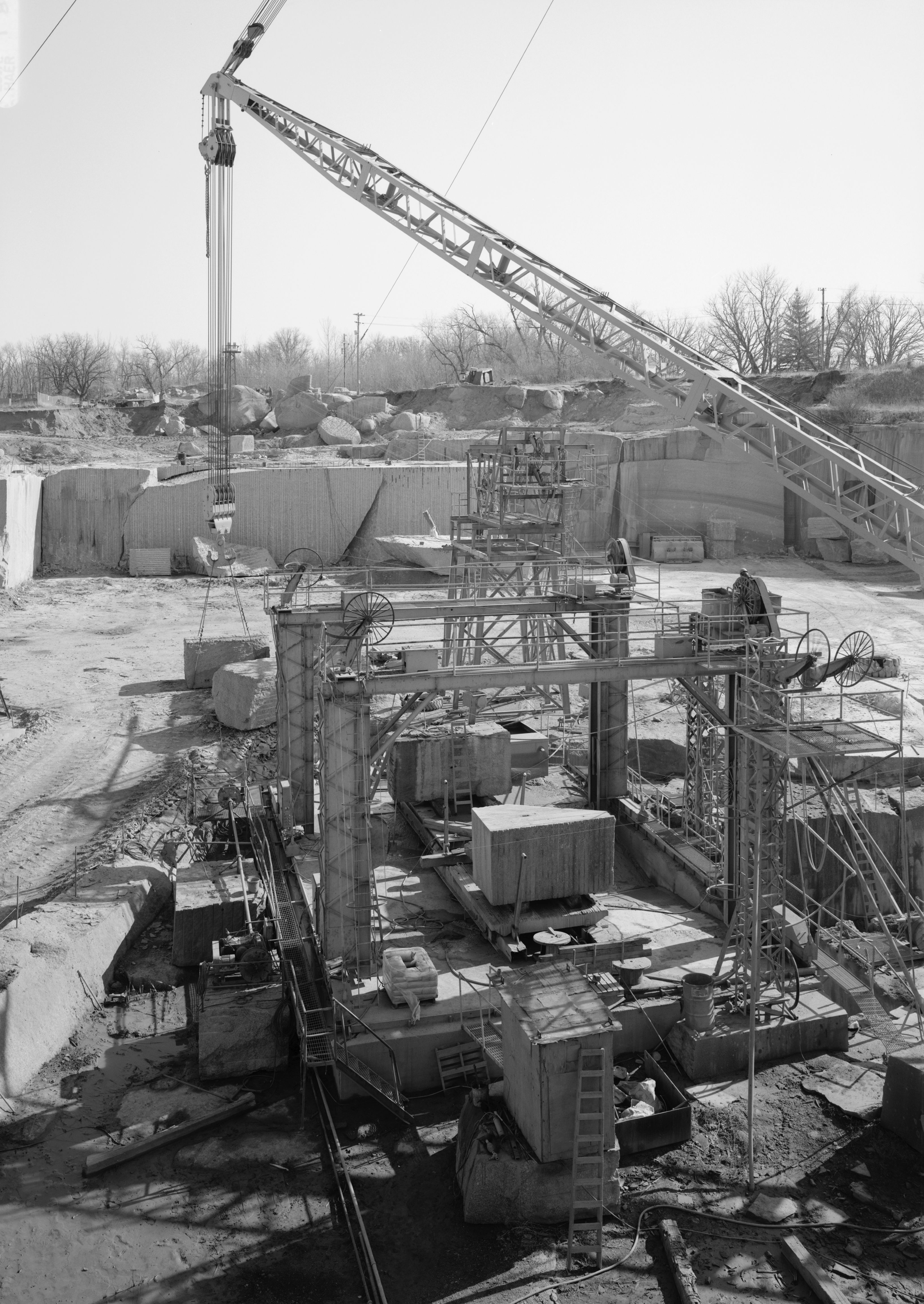
The Clark and McCormick Quarry in 1990

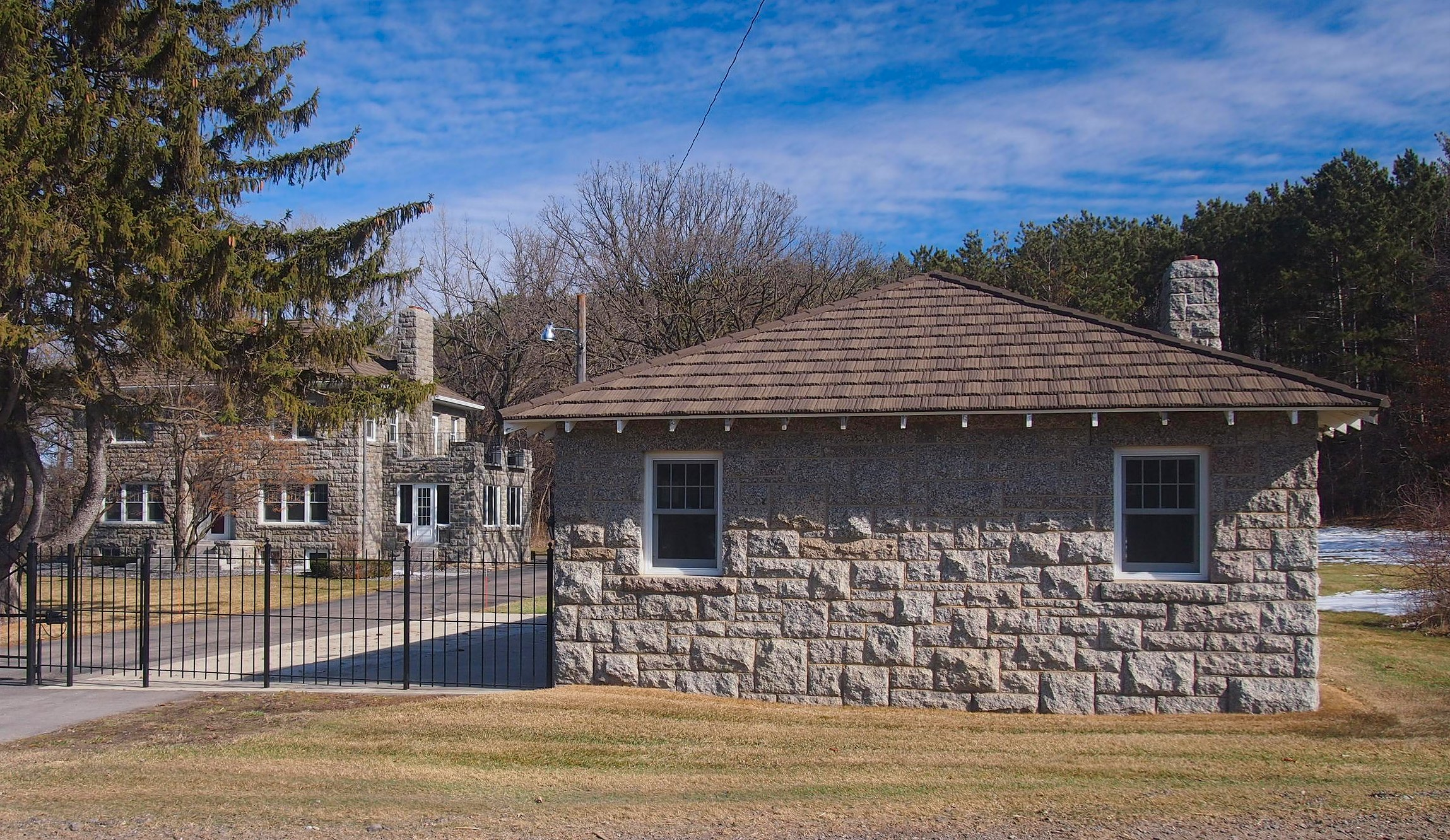
The John Clark House and garage from the southwest

== History ==
John Clark was a Scottish immigrant who worked as a stonecutter in his home country, then in Youngstown, Ohio; Detroit; and Stratford, Ontario, before settling in Saint Paul, Minnesota. He joined the firm of Matthew Breen, which had opened the state's first commercial quarry in 1868. Clark established two new quarries for Breen in eastern Stearns County.

In 1907 Clark formed his own partnership with fellow Saint Paul resident John McCormick. McCormick had connections with Archbishop John Ireland and secured a major contract to provide 250,000 cubic feet (7,100 m^{3}) of granite for the Cathedral of Saint Paul then under construction in the capital. By 1912 their Rockville quarry employed an average of 85 men and was producing 300 to 400 cubic feet (8.5–11.3 m^{3}) of finished stone daily. McCormick, who only planned to be involved for the duration of the cathedral contract, left the partnership in 1916, after which the business became the John Clark Company. Two years later the quarry ranked as Minnesota's largest producer of structural granite. Stone from the quarry was used in the Foley Square Courthouse in New York City, a hospital in St. Cloud, Minnesota, and dozens of other buildings around the country. The quarry was also the instrumental force behind Rockville's growth as a community. Stonecutters brought in from Scotland and Scandinavia were so numerous that they regularly co-opted Rockville's Main Street for soccer games after work.

John Clark continued to reside in Saint Paul until 1924, when his Rockville house was completed across the road from the quarry. Clark's son John Gordon Clark designed the house and company stonemasons handled the construction. It is one of the few residences in Stearns County actually built from local granite; the material was usually too valuable to use in anything but major civic and corporate buildings.

In 1942 the John Clark Company was purchased by Cold Spring Granite, now Coldspring.

== See also ==
- List of quarries in the United States
- National Register of Historic Places listings in Stearns County, Minnesota
