= Walker Cut Stone Company =

- U.S. National Register of Historic Places
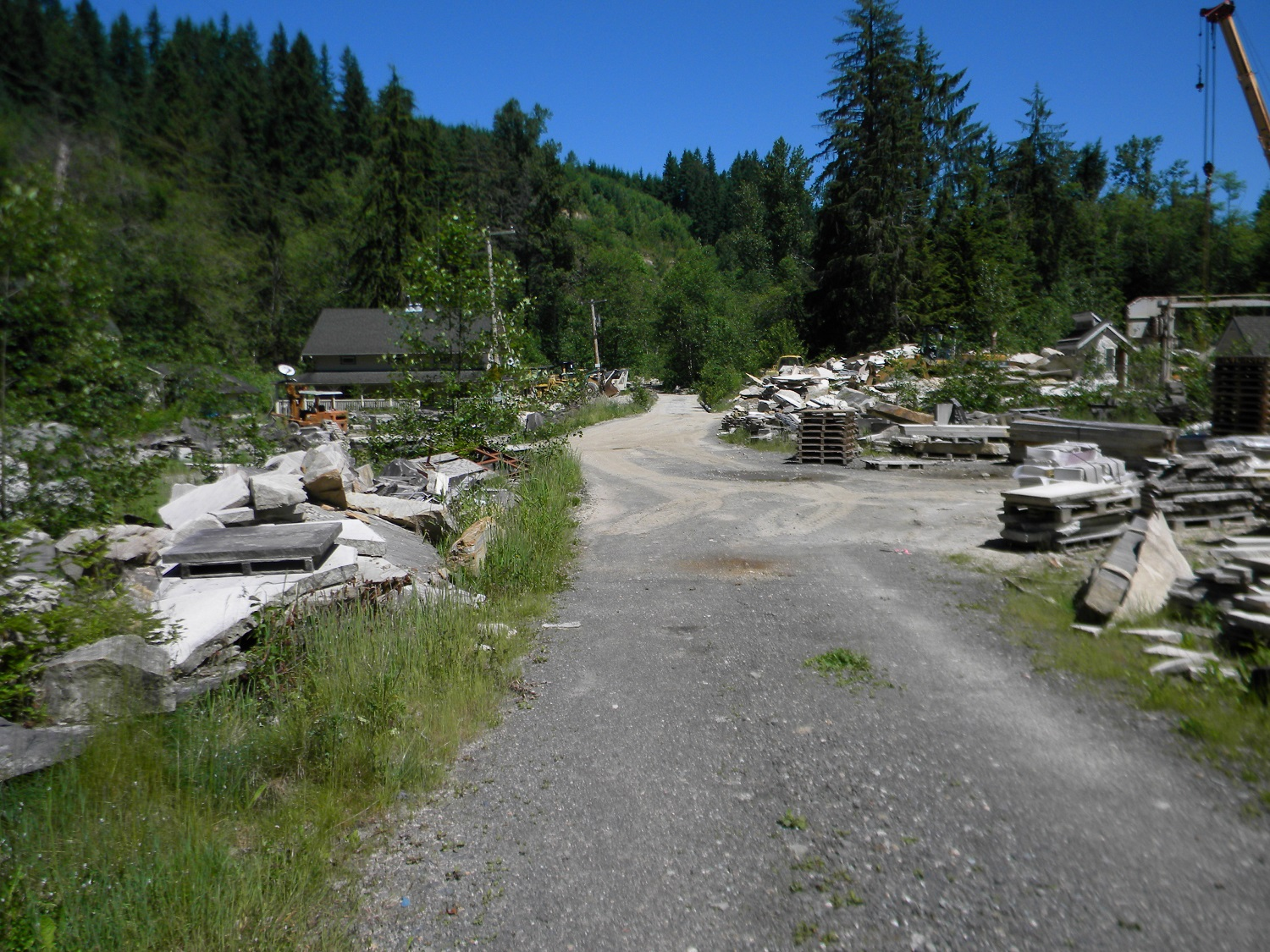
- Nearest city: Wilkeson, Washington
- Area: 40 acres (16 ha)
- Architectural style: Stone quarry
- NRHP reference No.: 78002770
- Added to NRHP: June 7, 1978

The Wilkeson Cut Stone Company operated the oldest sandstone quarry in the Pacific Northwest. It began operations in the 1870s and produced sandstone that was used for the Washington State Capitol in Olympia among other major buildings. The quarry and the company's other facilities near the town of Wilkeson, Washington, were listed on the National Register of Historic Places in 1978.

== History ==
The town of Wilkeson was settled following the discovery of coal in the Carbon River canyon in 1862. Mining began eleven years later and in 1876 the Northern Pacific Railroad (NPR) built a branch line to the area. The sandstone outcropping was noted by Sam Wilkeson in 1869. He and the Northern Pacific with Chief Engineer W. Milnor Roberts were on an expedition to study geology and terrain prior to selecting the NPR’s transcontinental route. The quarry was opened by the Northern Pacific in the 1870's road ballast. The first quarry building was begun in 1883 when the operation began selling to commercial contractors. St. Luke's Episcopal Church was completed in 1884 in Tacoma by Charles B. Wright, a former president of the Northern Pacific, in memory of his wife and daughter.

== Description ==
The Wilkeson Cut Stone Company quarry is on the east side of Wilkeson and 35 miles from Tacoma. It sits in the foothills to the northwest of Mt. Rainier around 1,000 feet (300 m) above sea level. The quarry had a single owner from 1911 until it closed. Most of the machinery was purchased by 1914 and has been in continuous use since 1929. The quarry has never been modernized. Steam power is used for the bore holes drills, donkey engines operate the derricks, the gang saws and associated pumps, being driven by a system of belts and wheels. Over time, the process was roofed over with frame board and batten or corrugated steel structures. The inclined tramway was closed and a 45-ton dump truck used to transport stone blocks from the quarry to the fabricating plant. The hillside roughly 250 feet (76 m) in height and 175 feet (53 m). Three derrick cranes form a triangle with interconnected guywires. The derricks carry men and equipment from the yard to temporary work platforms on the cliff face. The also move the stones from the rock face to the fabricating plant.

== Bibliography ==
- "Quarrying Wilkeson Sandstone", The Northwest. Northern Pacific Railway Company. May-June 1968, ppg. 13-15,
