= Barron County Pipestone Quarry =

- U.S. National Register of Historic Places
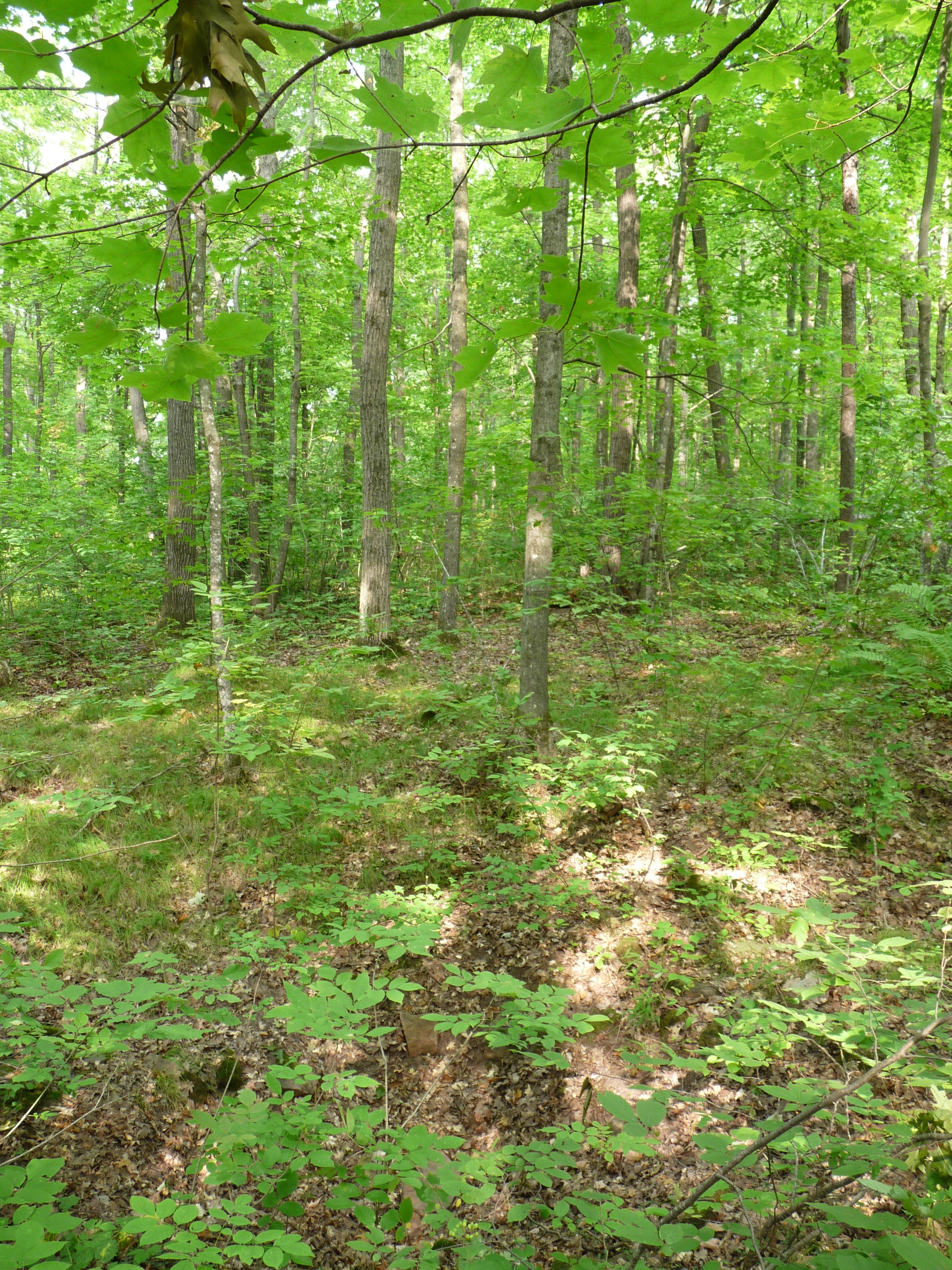
- Nearest city: Rice Lake, Wisconsin
- Area: 40 acres (16 ha)
- NRHP reference No.: 78000077
- Added to NRHP: December 22, 1978

The Barron County Pipestone Quarry is a sacred site in Native American history located in Doyle, Wisconsin, United States. It was added to the National Register of Historic Places in 1978.

== Description ==
Several tribes have used rock from the quarry to create ceremonial pipes. Historically, various tribes would travel long distances to acquire the special red-colored stone found in the quarry. A widespread legend among the tribes is that the stone gets its color from the flesh and blood of their ancestors.
