= Woral C. Smith Lime Kiln and Limestone House =

Historic place in the US

- U.S. National Register of Historic Places
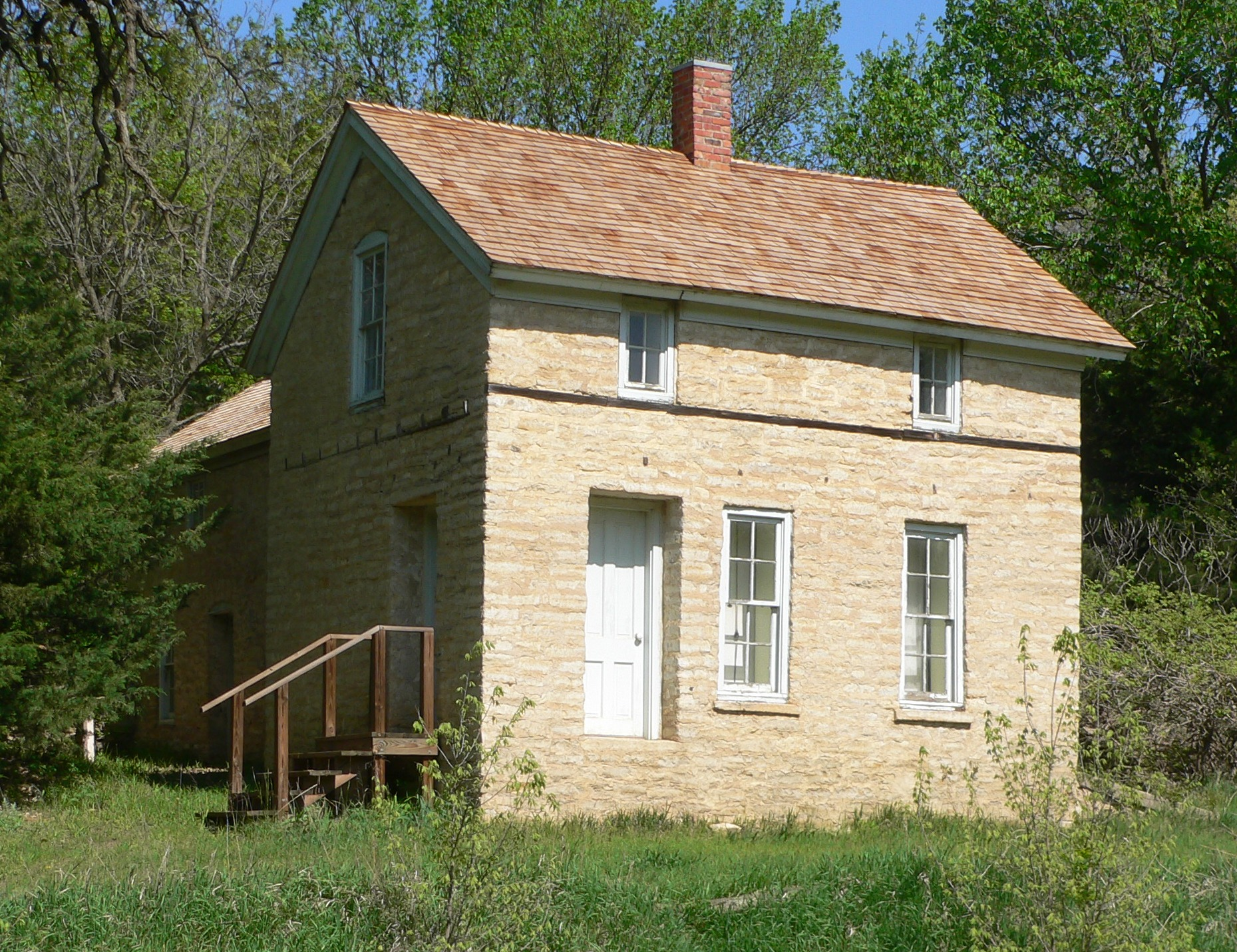

- Location within Nebraska
- Nearest city: Fairbury, Nebraska
- Area: 90 acres (36 ha)
- Built: 1874
- Built by: Woral C. Smith
- NRHP reference No.: 74001124
- Added to NRHP: December 3, 1974

The Woral C. Smith Lime Kiln and Limestone House near Fairbury, Nebraska was built in 1874. It was listed on the National Register of Historic Places in 1974.

It consists of a lime kiln built in 1874 and a one-and-a-half-story house built of limestone and lime in 1876.
