= Green Quarry Site =

Archaeological site in Michigan, United States

- U.S. National Register of Historic Places
- Nearest city: Mears, Michigan
- Area: 40 acres (16 ha)
- NRHP reference No.: 72001478
- Added to NRHP: November 9, 1972

The Green Quarry Site, designated 20OA7, is an archaeological site located near Pentwater, Michigan. It was listed on the National Register of Historic Places in 1972. The site, covering 40 acres (16 ha), is the only known source of Lambrix chert, which was used for a variety of prehistoric tools.
