= Magothy Quartzite Quarry Archeological Site =

- U.S. National Register of Historic Places
- Nearest city: Pasadena, Maryland
- MPS: Prehistoric Human Adaptation to the Coastal Plain Environment of Anne Arundel County MPS
- NRHP reference No.: 91001599
- Added to NRHP: November 8, 1991

The Magothy Quartzite Quarry Archeological Site is an archaeological site near Pasadena in Anne Arundel County, Maryland. The site consists of several large outcroppings of quartzite and sandstone, that may have been utilized by prehistoric Native American groups as early as the Middle Archaic period, if not earlier.

It was listed on the National Register of Historic Places in 1991.
