= Big Run Quarry Site =

Archaeological site in Virginia, United States

- U.S. National Register of Historic Places
- Virginia Landmarks Register
- Nearest city: Luray, Virginia
- Area: 0.1 acres (0.040 ha)
- NRHP reference No.: 85003177
- VLR No.: 082-0323

Significant dates
- Added to NRHP: December 13, 1985
- Designated VLR: September 16, 1982

The Big Run Quarry Site is an archaeological site on the National Register of Historic Places near Luray, Virginia. It is located in Shenandoah National Park.
