= Rose Lime Kiln =

- U.S. National Register of Historic Places
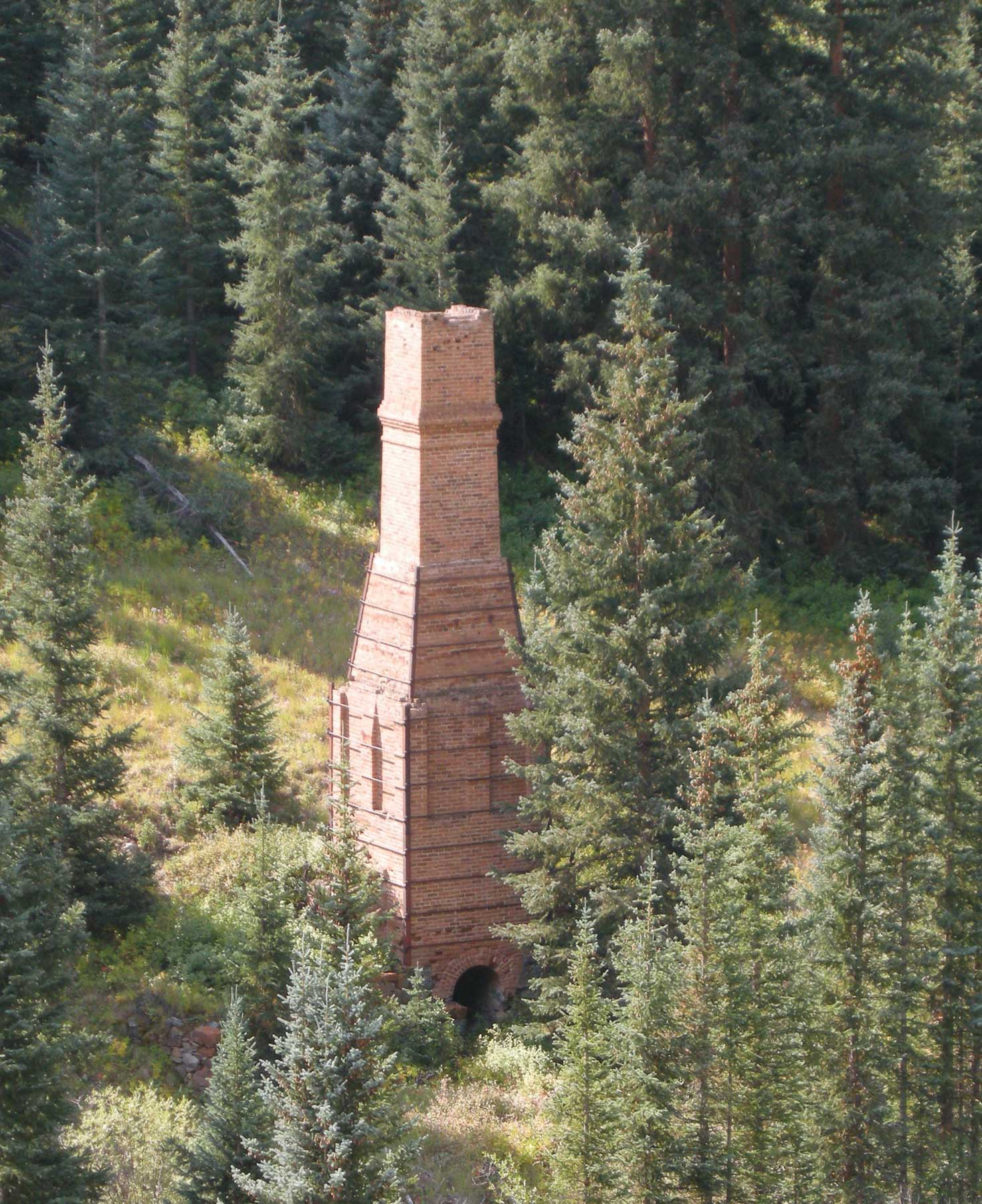

- Location within Colorado
- Nearest city: Lake City, Colorado
- Coordinates: 37°58′23″N 107°31′24″W
- Area: 5 acres (2.0 ha)
- Built by: Tarkington, Samuel
- MPS: Hinsdale County Metal Mining MPS
- NRHP reference No.: 93000293
- Added to NRHP: April 8, 1993

The Rose Lime Kiln, near Lake City, Colorado, was built in 1881. It was listed on the National Register of Historic Places in 1993.

The lime kiln was built by local brickmason Samuel Tarkington for George S. Lee, a Capitol City, Colorado capitalist and mine developer. It was named in honor of George's daughter Rose Lee and processed limestone mined from the Rose Lime Lode, an adjoining mining claim.

It is located off Hinsdale County Road 20 about 12 miles (19 km) southwest of Lake City, across Henson Creek. It has also been known as Henson Creek Chimney. The Kiln was destroyed by an avalanche in the spring of 2019.
