= Iron Hill Cut Jasper Quarry Archeological Site =

- U.S. National Register of Historic Places
- Nearest city: Elkton, Maryland
- Area: 42.7 acres (17.3 ha)
- MPS: Delaware Chalcedony Complex TR
- NRHP reference No.: 83003754
- Added to NRHP: December 16, 1983

The Iron Hill Cut Jasper Quarry Archeological Site is an archeological site located near Elkton, Cecil County, Maryland, United States. The site is one of a group of interrelated sites illustrating the various phases of stone tool production and living area activities.

It was listed on the National Register of Historic Places in 1983.
