= Dutchess Quarry Cave Site =

- U.S. National Register of Historic Places
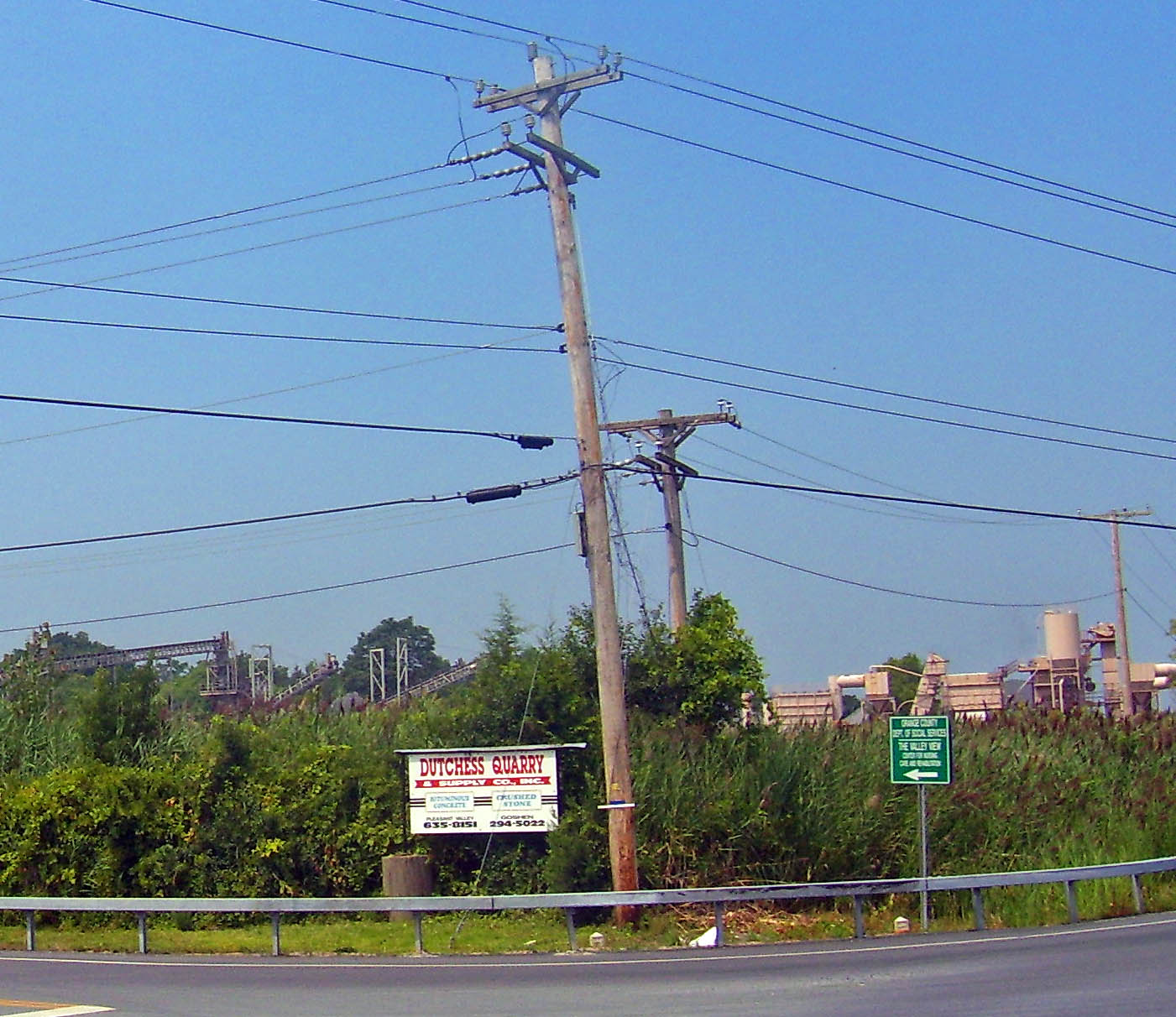
- Looking into the quarry from across Route 17A, 2007

- Location within New York Location within the United States
- Location: Town of Goshen, NY
- Nearest city: Middletown
- Coordinates: 41°21′35″N 74°21′29″W
- Area: 177 acres (72 ha)
- NRHP reference No.: 74001289; 97000512
- Added to NRHP: 1974; boundaries increased 1997

The Dutchess Quarry Cave Site is located along NY 17A in the Town of Goshen in Orange County, New York. It is midway between the village of Goshen and Florida, at the junction of Quarry Road (Orange County Route 68), built into the side of a 580-foot (177 m) hill known as Mount Lookout.

In the 1960s, archaeologists digging at the site found caves with artifacts left by hunter-gatherers 12,000 years ago, during the last Ice Age. A Paleo-Indian fluted point, a very rare stone tool, was among them. At the time of its discovery it was the oldest such site east of the Mississippi.

The site has been at the center of a battle between local archaeologists and the Pleasant Valley-based Dutchess Quarry and Supply Company, which actively produces dolomite gravel on the site. The company's operations have expanded in recent years to meet growing demand in the region, moving its activities closer to the cave site than they were when first discovered. It monitors the caves closely when it needs to do blasting, and the county has established a preserve on the most important 20 acres (4 ha) of the 177-acre (71 ha) site. It was added to the National Register of Historic Places in 1974, with the site's boundaries expanded in 1997.

But the researchers fear that a hitherto undisturbed area known as the Alpine Meadow, which may contain even more artifacts but also has road-grade dolomite, may be mined. They would like to see the county acquire at least a conservation easement on the cave site, and include it in its Open Space Plan. The company, which has been mining gravel on the property since 1938, says it is open to any solutions that do not adversely impact its extraction operations.

The only person authorized to conduct tours of the site left the area in 2004, and it is not otherwise open to the public due to the quarrying operations.
