= Harvey Mountain Quarry =

- U.S. National Register of Historic Places
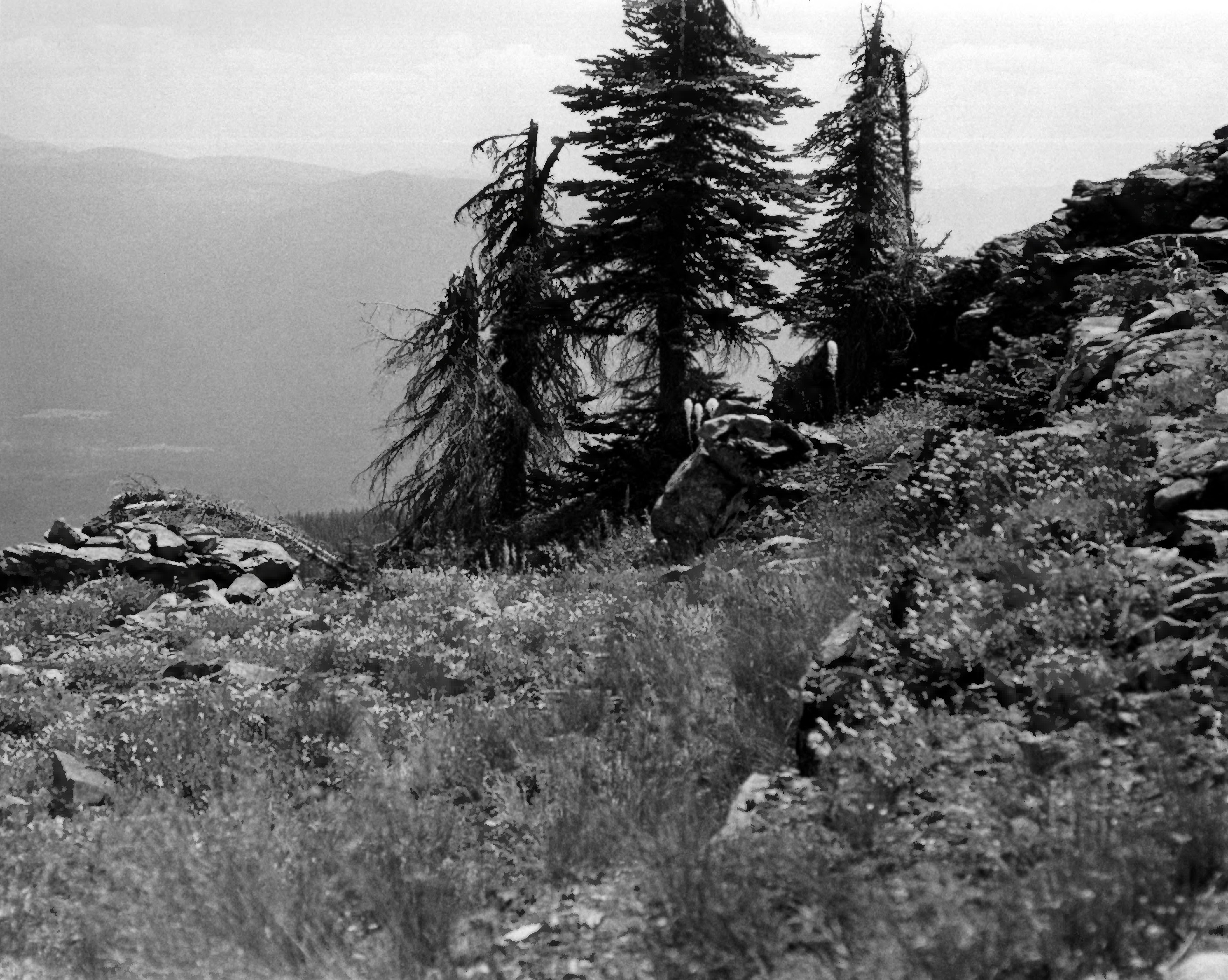
- Location: Address restricted, vicinity of Bonners Ferry, Idaho
- Area: 20 acres (8.1 ha)
- NRHP reference No.: 78001053
- Added to NRHP: June 23, 1978

The Harvey Mountain Quarry near Bonners Ferry, Idaho, United States, is a prehistoric stone quarry. As an archeological site it was listed on the National Register of Historic Places in 1978.

It was discovered in 1971 by a mining survey crew and it was studied in 1975 by the University of Idaho.

Argillite can be found in the quarry. A spear point found near Lake Windemere in British Columbia is made of argillite that may have come from this quarry.
