= Eastburn–Jeanes Lime Kilns Historic District =

Historic district in Delaware, United States

- U.S. National Register of Historic Places
- U.S. Historic district
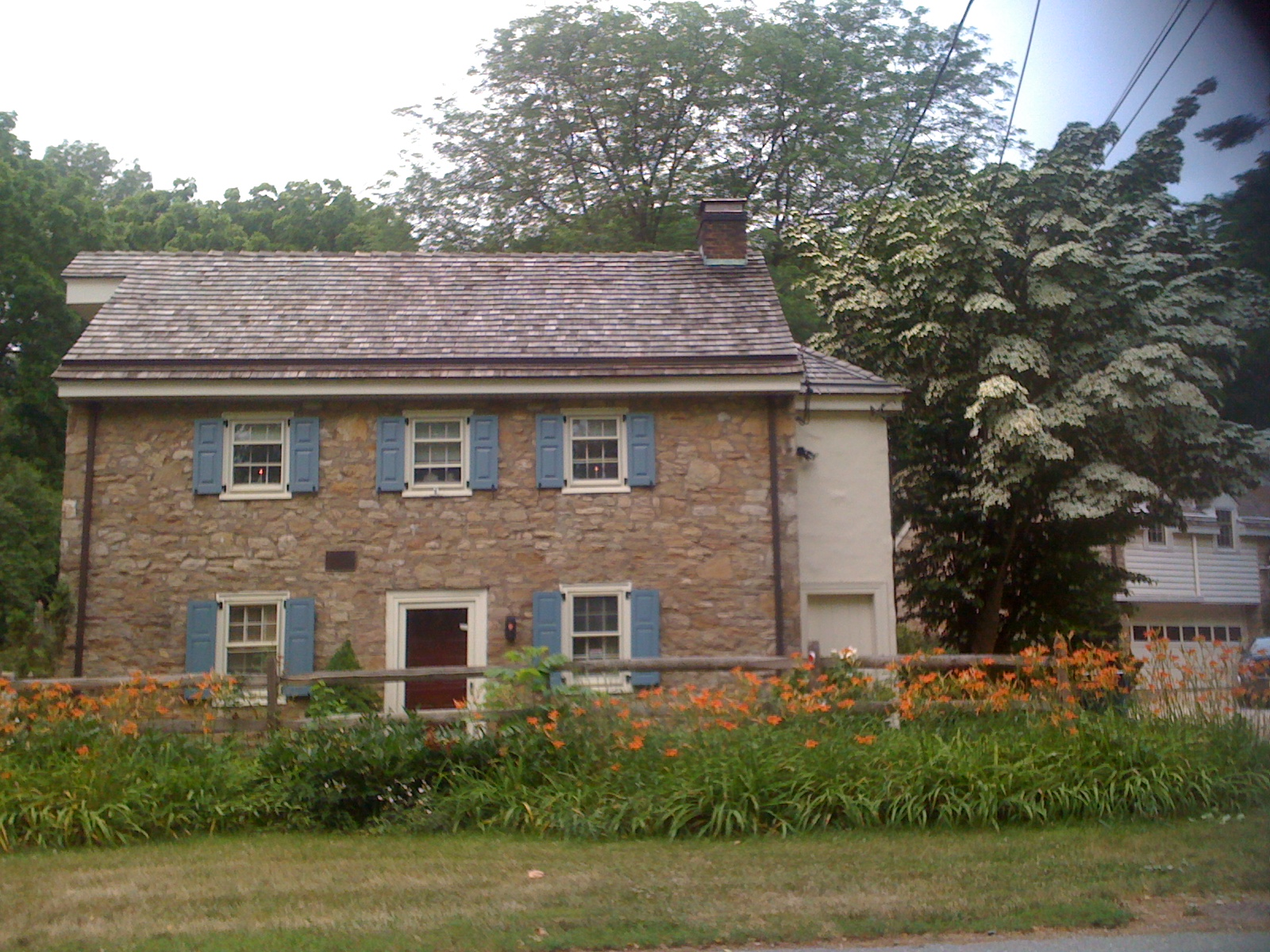
- Blacks Mill, Eastburn–Jeanes Lime Kilns Historic District, June 2010

- Location within Delaware Location within the United States
- Location: North of Newark on Limestone Rd., near Newark, Delaware
- Coordinates: 39.741601°N 75.716673°W
- Area: 200 acres (81 ha)
- Built: c. 1820
- NRHP reference No.: 77000389
- Added to NRHP: April 28, 1977

Eastburn–Jeanes Lime Kilns Historic District is a national historic district located near Newark, New Castle County, Delaware. It encompasses six contributing buildings, two contributing sites, and eight contributing structures. They are eight line kilns and two abandoned quarries, together with stone buildings erected by Abel Jeanes and Joseph Eastburn. The buildings include the Abel Jeans Manor House, Blacks Mill, horse stable, and outhouse. They reflect the local lime-burning industry that started in 1816, and operated into the early 1900s.

It was added to the National Register of Historic Places in 1977.
