= Beaumont-Tyson Quarry District =

Historic district in Missouri, United States

- U.S. National Register of Historic Places
- Location: Address restricted, near St. Louis, Missouri
- Area: 212 acres (86 ha)
- NRHP reference No.: 74001079
- Added to NRHP: October 10, 1974

The Beaumont-Tyson Quarry District is a 212 acres (86 ha) historic district in Jefferson County, Missouri and St. Louis County, Missouri which was listed on the National Register of Historic Places in 1974.

It is denoted Missouri Archaeological Survey Number 23JE338 - Ranken Quarry. It includes 20 contributing sites.
