= State Quarry, Iowa Men's Reformatory =

- U.S. National Register of Historic Places
- U.S. Historic district
- Location within Iowa Location within the United States
- Location: Unnamed road along the eastern side of Buffalo Creek northwest of Anamosa
- Coordinates: 42°07′23″N 91°19′08″W
- Area: 18 acres (7.3 ha)
- Built: 1905-1942
- Architectural style: Romanesque Revival
- MPS: Municipal, County and State Corrections Properties MPS
- NRHP reference No.: 92001666
- Added to NRHP: December 18, 1992

The State Quarry, Iowa Men's Reformatory is a nationally recognized historic district located northwest of Anamosa, Iowa, United States. It was listed on the National Register of Historic Places in 1992. At the time of its nomination the district consisted of five resources, including three contributing buildings, one contributing site, and one contributing structure. This was the second quarry operated by the Anamosa prison. The first was opened in 1872 near Stone City in 1872, and it was exhausted by 1877. They acquired two 40-acre (16 ha) parcels here in 1878 and another the following year. The stone quarried and dressed on site by the prisoners was used to build the prison and sold to other government agencies in the state for their building purposes. None of the stone was placed on the open market. The Chicago and North Western Railroad provided a connection to transport the materials. The last of the usable building stone was quarried in 1915, when they shifted to crushed gravel. The quarry remained in operation until 1943.

The historic buildings were built between 1904 and 1938. They are all stone structures built in a simplified Romanesque Revival style. The influence of the style is found in the "heavy massing, texture of the stone, and the window, door, and corner treatments." The buildings were built for the following uses: dining hall (1905), tool house (1905), and the scale house (1938). The Pratt truss bridge across Buffalo Creek, the contributing structure, was built in 1912.
