= Norcross Brothers Granite Quarry =

- U.S. National Register of Historic Places
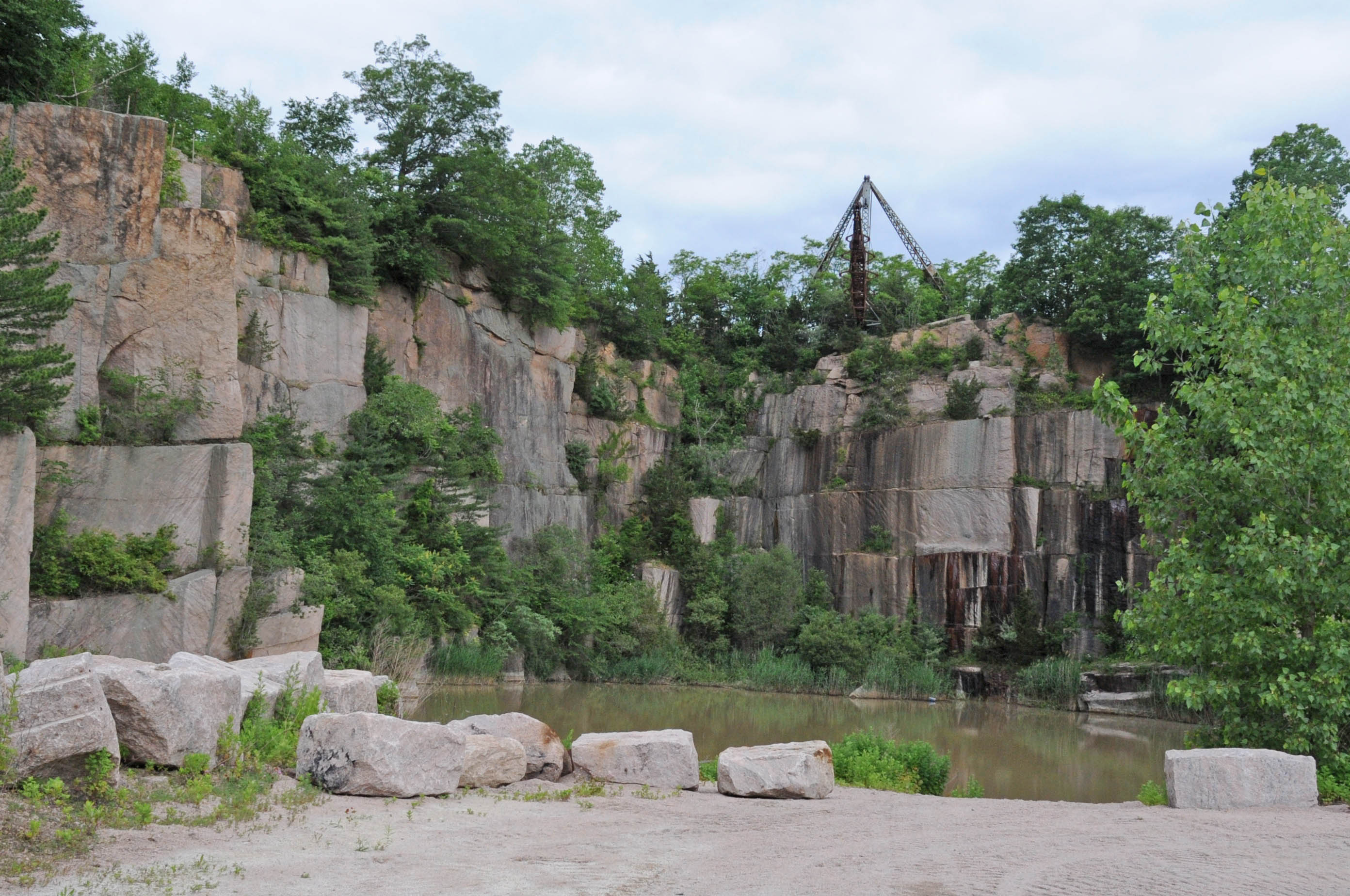

- Location within Connecticut Location within the United States
- Location: Quarry Road, Branford, Connecticut
- Coordinates: 41°17′1″N 72°44′32″W
- Area: 69 acres (28 ha)
- Built: 1887
- NRHP reference No.: 03000315
- Added to NRHP: June 6, 2003

The Norcross Brothers Granite Quarry, more recently the Castellucci Quarry, is a historic granite quarry on Quarry Road in Branford, Connecticut. Opened in 1887 by the Norcross Brothers construction firm, it supplied granite to a number of high-profile construction projects, including the Statue of Liberty and the Marshall Field and Company Building, and was in operation until 1980. It was listed on the National Register of Historic Places in 2003, and is now owned by the town as a passive recreation area.

== Description and history ==
The former Norcross Brothers Granite Quarry is located in a rural setting of eastern Branford, at the northern end of Quarry Road. The quarry is part of a larger parcel, where there is still ongoing quarrying. The historic quarry is a semicircular cut into a hillside on the west side of the property, between the north end of the public road and the active quarry. It has a stepped face, which extends about 50 feet (15 m) above the ground to the east, and is about 300 feet (91 m) wide. The lower reach of the quarry is filled with water, obscuring the depth from which stone was taken. Built features of the quarry include a wooden derrick near the upper lip, which was originally used as part of a hoisting mechanism. Foundational remnants of a stone-cutting shop are located nearer the road end, and the property is scattered with stone fragments and old tools.

The quarry was opened in 1887 by the Norcross Brothers, a construction firm based in Worcester, Massachusetts. Norcross was founded in 1864, and was by the end of the 19th century one of the nation's highest-profile construction firms. The company owned a number of stone quarries, from which materials were taken for building projects nationwide. Stone from this quarry is known to have been used in the Corcoran Gallery in Washington, DC, in the Howard-Tilton Memorial Library in New Orleans, and in the base of the Statue of Liberty. The quarry had a pronounced effect on the local economy and the town's demographics, bringing in a large number of immigrants into the formerly "Yankee" community. The quarry was sold by the Norcross Brothers in 1926, and operated intermittently until 1980.

== See also ==
- National Register of Historic Places listings in New Haven County, Connecticut
