= California Granite Company =

- U.S. National Register of Historic Places
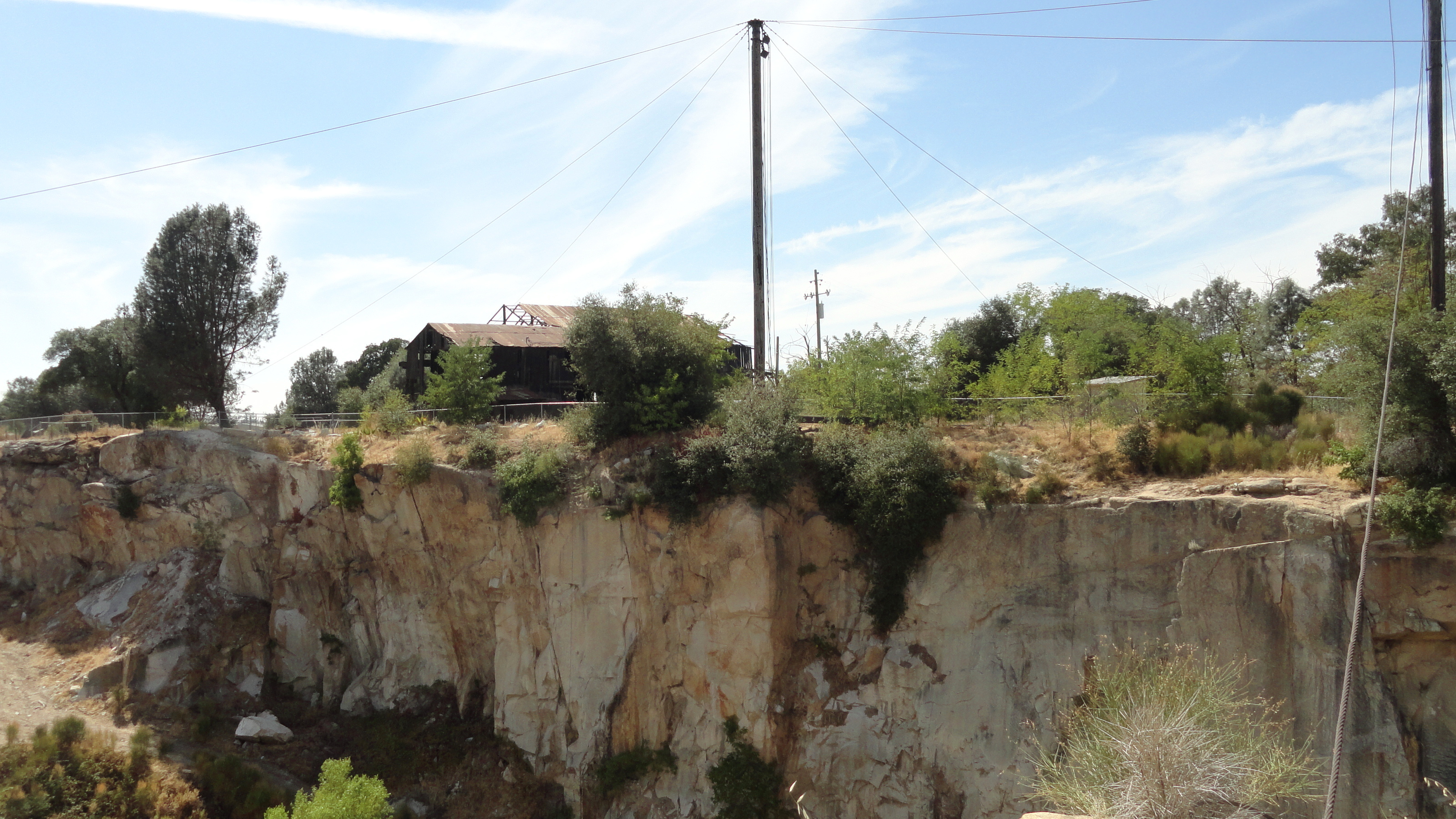

- Location within California
- Location: 5255 Pacific St., Rocklin, California
- Coordinates: 38°47′21″N 121°14′08″W
- Area: 7.2 acres (2.9 ha)
- Built: 1865
- NRHP reference No.: 12000375
- Added to NRHP: July 3, 2012

The California Granite Company, at 5255 Pacific St. in Rocklin, California, dates from 1865. It was listed on the National Register of Historic Places in 2012.

It is an extractive facility which has also been known as Capitol Granite Co., as Union Granite Co., and as Big Gun Mining Co..

The listing included three contributing buildings, four contributing structures, and a contributing site, on 7.2 acres (2.9 ha).
