= Orofino Historic District =

Historic district in Idaho, United States

- U.S. National Register of Historic Places
- U.S. Historic district
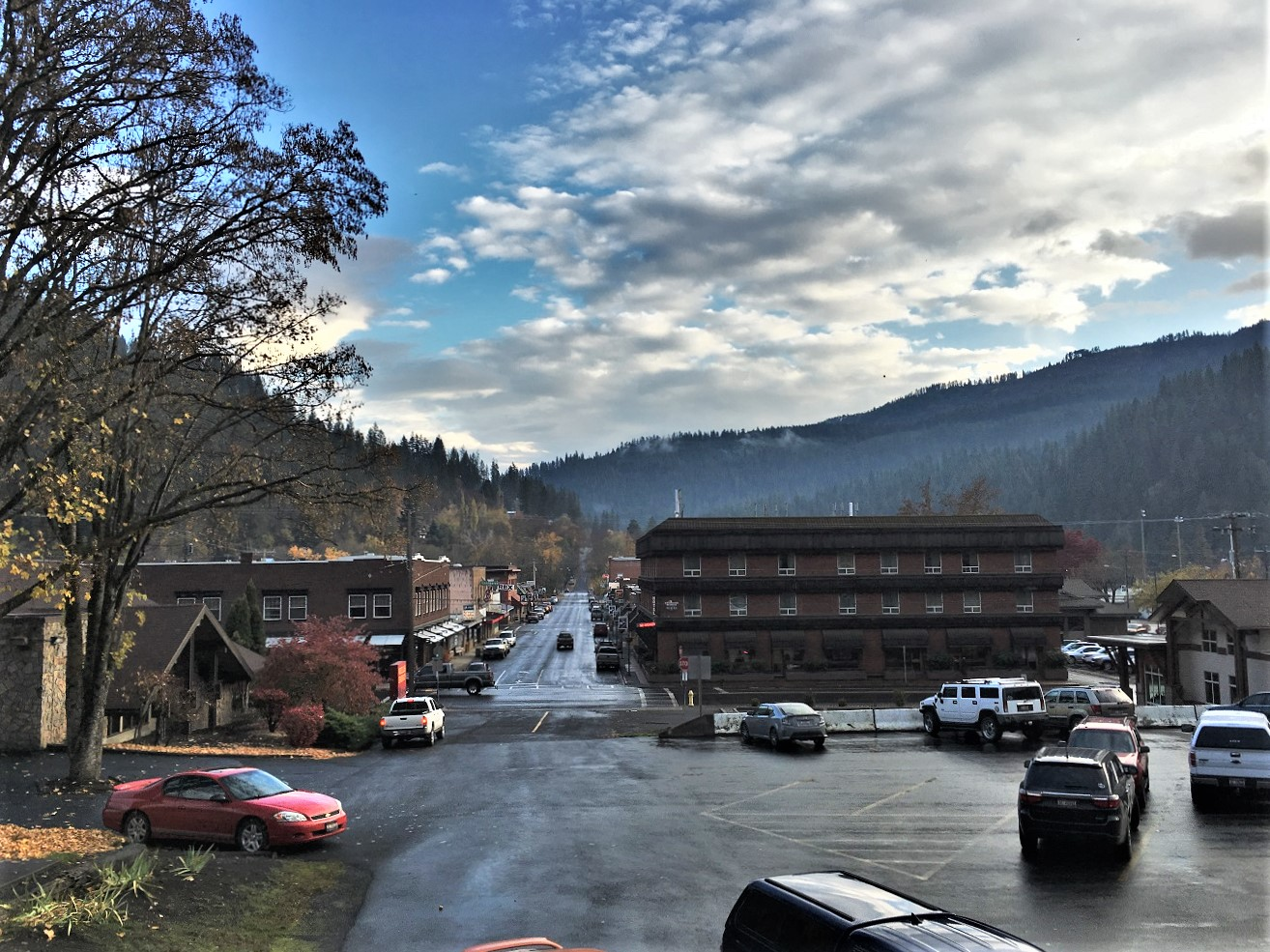

- Location within Idaho Location within the United States
- Location: 2nd, Dewey, Main, Johnson, and 6th Sts., Orofino, Idaho
- Coordinates: 46°28′32″N 116°15′06″W
- Area: 5 acres (2.0 ha)
- Architectural style: Colonial Revival, Bungalow/craftsman, Queen Anne
- NRHP reference No.: 82000384
- Added to NRHP: October 29, 1982

The Orofino Historic District is a 5-acre (2.0 ha) historic district in Orofino, Idaho that was listed on the National Register of Historic Places in 1982. It is bounded roughly by 2nd, Dewey, Main, Johnson, and 6th Streets in Orofino.

It includes one- and two-story frame houses and commercial buildings developed during 1895–1932. It also includes several lime kilns.

The district's land was homesteaded by Clifford P. Fuller after the Nez Perce Indian Reservation was opened for homesteading in 1895, and his home is included. His development company, the Clearwater Improvement Company, platted the town.
