= Godey Lime Kilns =

- U.S. National Register of Historic Places
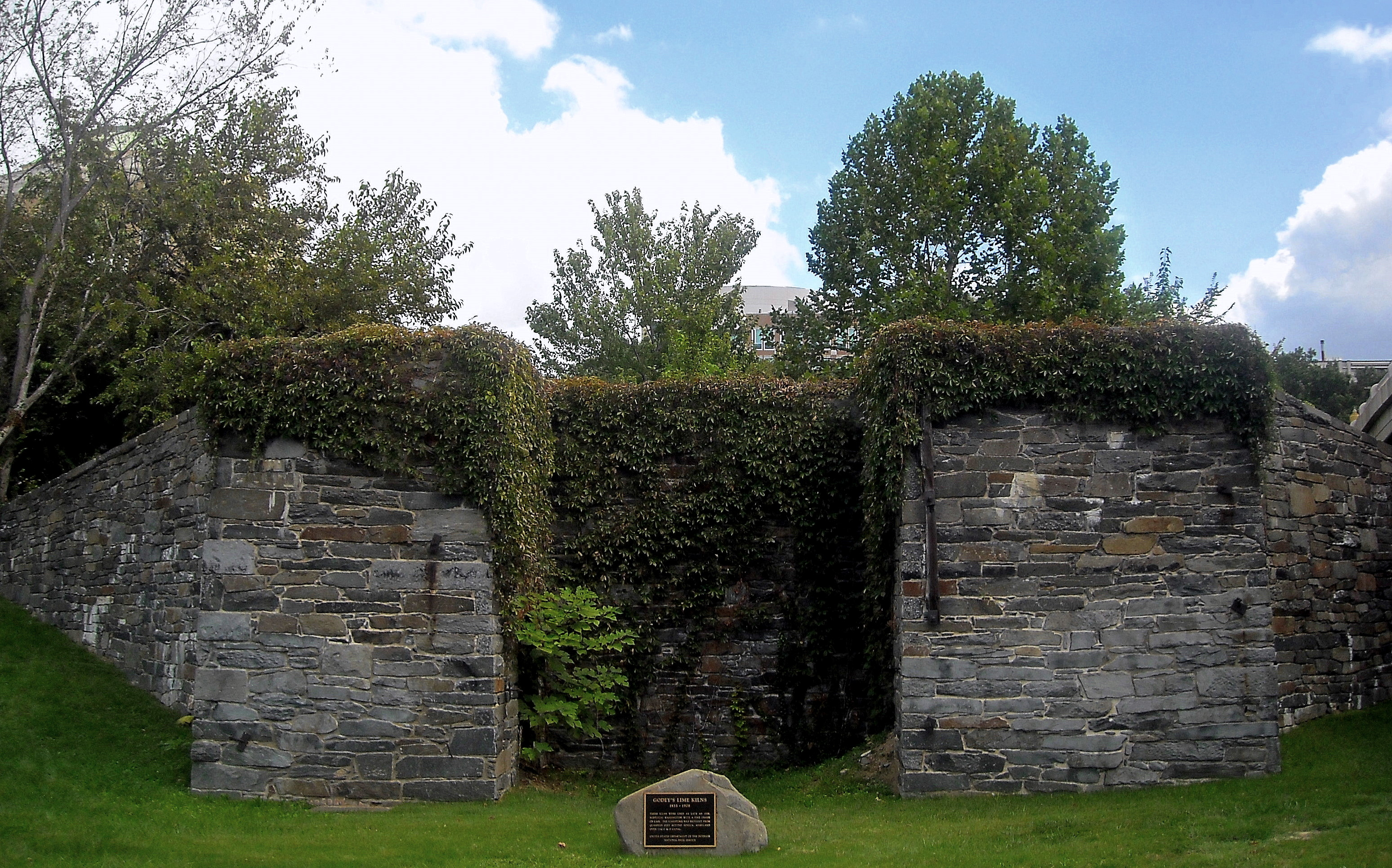

- Location within Central Washington, D.C. Location within the District of Columbia Location within the United States
- Location: Rock Creek and Potomac Pkwy. at 27th and L Sts., NW., Washington, District of Columbia
- Coordinates: 38°54′12″N 77°3′22″W
- Area: less than one acre
- Built: 1864
- NRHP reference No.: 73000221
- Added to NRHP: November 2, 1973

The Godey Lime Kilns, also known as Washington Lime Kilns, are an historical industrial building ruin, located beside the interchange of Rock Creek Parkway and Whitehurst Freeway, near the western end of L Street, Northwest, Washington, D.C., in the Foggy Bottom neighborhood.

== History ==
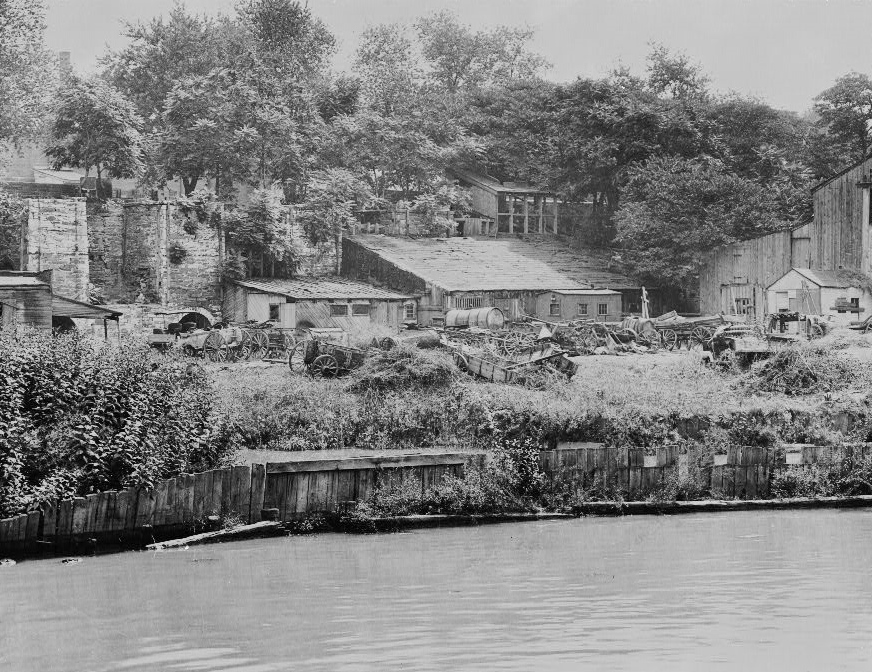
Exterior from the West

Located on the east bank of Rock Creek, at the terminus of the Chesapeake and Ohio Canal, the kilns produced lime for construction of the city of Washington, D.C. Built in 1864, by William H. Godey, the site originally included four wood-fired ovens that were used to make lime and plaster, from limestone. The business was operational until 1907, when all of the wooden structures at the site were removed.

Two of the four kilns were removed to make way for ramps between Rock Creek Parkway and Whitehurst Freeway. A partial restoration of the remaining kilns was completed by January 1, 1967. The remains were added to the National Register of Historic Places, on May 22, 1973.
