= Owens, Ohio =

Unincorporated community in Ohio, U.S.

Coordinates: 40°31′13″N 83°09′29″W

Owens is an unincorporated community in Marion County, in the U.S. state of Ohio.

The community was named for John Owens, a businessperson in the mining industry. Owens developed around Owens Quarry, a limestone quarry and crusher plant near Marion, Ohio, in southeastern Marion County. In addition to employee housing there was an opera house, U.S. post office, general store, and train station. Now owned by Dennis Mattix, the opera house has been restored. It is located at 1674 Owens Road.

Owen [Station] was located in Pleasant township on the Columbus, Hocking Valley and Toledo Railroad, which established a station about 4 miles south of Marion. The railroad traversed the whole length of the western half of the township from north to south.

A post office was established there in 1876 with John Owen[s] as the postmaster, and called Owen Station. The word "Station" was eliminated in 1882. In 1908, the name changed again to Owens, when John D. Owens was postmaster. The post office was discontinued in 1930.

A hotel, store, express office and opera house were located there. In this vicinity, John Owen produced quicklime from the quarry located there.
