= Frazier Quarry =

American quarry

Coordinates: 38°25′32″N 78°51′25″W

The Frazier Quarry, Incorp.
- Type: Private
- Industry: Quarry
- Founded: 1915
- Founder: Robert Y. Frazier
- Headquarters: Harrisonburg, Virginia, United States
- Area served: primarily Eastern United States
- Products: Fire pits, dimension bluestone, fountains, benches, crushed stone
- Number of employees: 50 (2008)
- Website: Frazier Quarry Home

The Frazier Quarry Inc. (TFQ) is a large family-owned quarry and stone product retailer in the United States. The company's headquarters are in Harrisonburg, Virginia, in the Shenandoah Valley. It stands as the sole producer of Shenandoah Valley Bluestone and offers a variety of crushed stone and retail products. Established in 1915 as Betts Quarry, the business was rebranded in 1946 as The Frazier Quarry Incorporated, taking its name from the family that owns it. TFQ promotes its products under its proprietary brand, as well as under the Stonewall Grey label, which represents products that are quarried and sold directly on-site.

== History ==
Beginning in 1915, TFQ has been a prominent business serving the Shenandoah Valley. The quarry was founded to function as a cornerstone to the region by providing crushed stone for new construction projects and helping to expedite the growth of the Shenandoah Valley. Production of crushed stone from TFQ has remained a mainstay in construction projects in the area. The quarry has also begun other initiatives to supply the Valley with stone products. Most notably, the production of “The Valley’s Own Bluestone” has helped to resurrect the region’s Bluestone construction by providing it from a local source. Other aspects of TFQ's expansion are largely Do-It-Yourself (DIY) outdoor living or landscaping projects, which do not require professional installation. These projects include landscaping stone, stone fire pits/fountain kits, flagstone, and solid stone garden benches.

== Historical Innovation ==
Bluestone is an identifying characteristic of Shenandoah Valley architecture, and can be seen in the buildings erected by the Valley's earliest European settlers, who quarried the stone from their own lands to construct foundations and chimneys. Architects from the area have historically used bluestone in the construction of major universities and historical sites across the Valley, including the "Bluestone Campus” of James Madison University, the Virginia Military Institute, Washington and Lee University, Belle Grove Plantation, and the Stonewall Jackson Home. In recent decades, bluestone construction has become less prevalent due to difficulty sourcing the material from nearby sites. In response, TFQ aims to provide affordable bluestone locally.

== Environmental Consciousness ==
The quarry aims to reduce fuel consumption by promoting use of local stone. TFQ stone products may also be utilized in the construction of LEED-certified (Leadership in Energy and Environmental Design) facilities, in concert with energy efficient systems. Stone such as that from the Frazier Quarry has increasingly been recognized as suitable material for environmental remediation projects involving stream bank fortification, erosion control, and soil stabilization.

Examples of environmental projects include:

- Land Reclamation – Re-filling, re-grading, and re-vegetating stone extraction sites, creating parks, school grounds, agricultural land, arboretums, etc.
- Wildlife Preservation – TFQ preserves the natural habitats of the plant and animal life in the areas immediately surrounding mining operations. These buffer zones serve as de facto preserves for local wildlife, as trespassers, hunting, and vehicles are prohibited.
- Erosion Control – Large stone boulders "Rip Rap", help prevent and control erosion, protect stream banks, and slow floodwaters.
- AgLime – AgLime, a powdery byproduct of processing crushed stone (high in calcium and magnesium) is spread over fields in order to stabilize soil chemistry and increase crop yield.
- Low-Emission Machinery – TFQ's low-emission quarry machinery utilizes ACERT engines, which adhere to the Environmental Protection Agency’s required Tier 2 and Tier 3 restriction, while improving performance, durability, and fuel efficiency.
- Recycling Oil – TFQ collects waste hydrocarbons and lubricants from the heavy machinery involved in the quarrying process and burns them in specially-designed furnaces for heat.
