= Quarry Limekiln =

Historical place in the US

- U.S. National Register of Historic Places
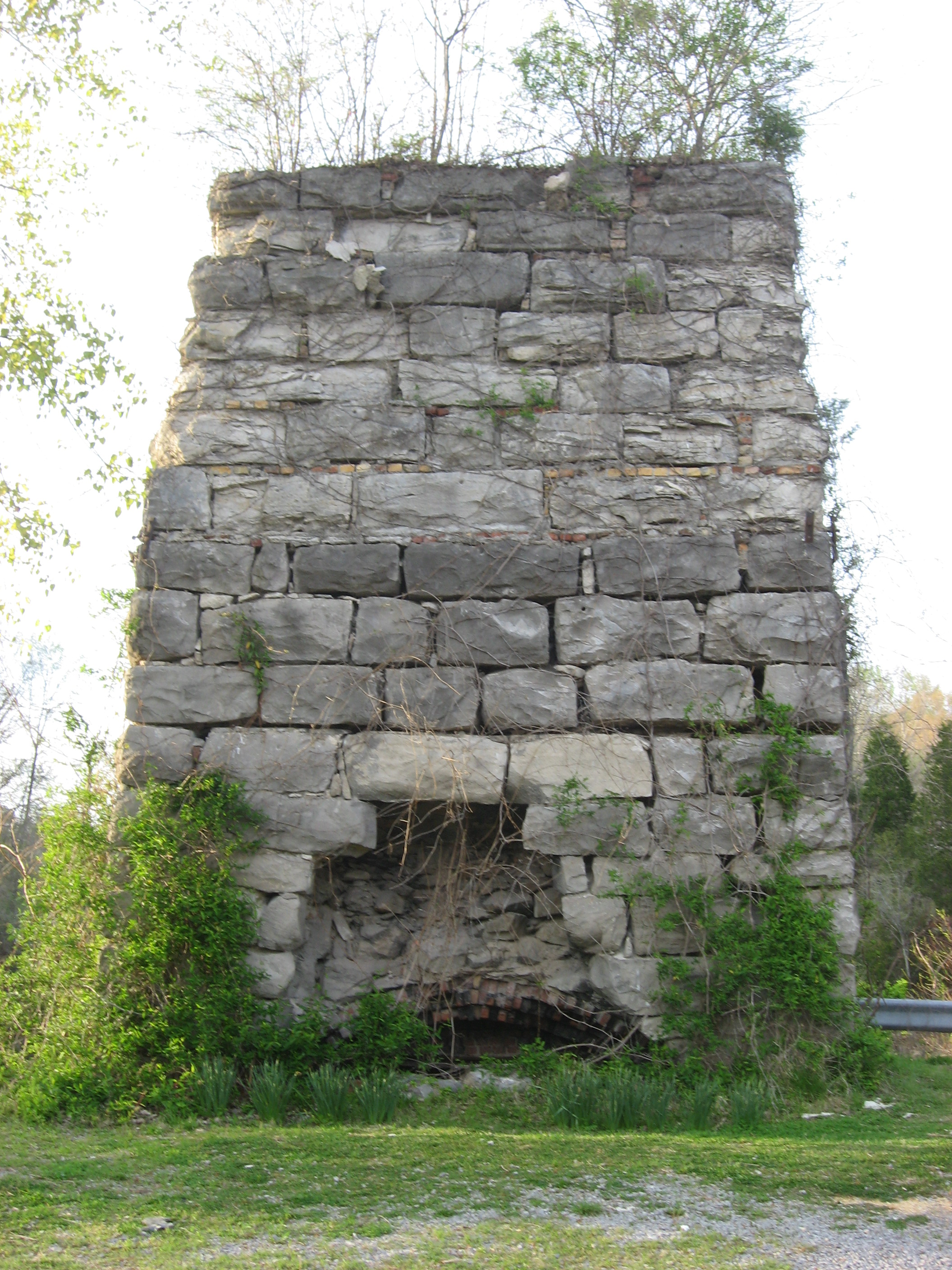

- Location within Tennessee Location within the United States
- Location: TN 49, approx 0.25 mi. E of Denmark Rd., Erin, Tennessee
- Coordinates: 36°19′01″N 87°42′44″W
- Area: 2.2 acres (0.89 ha)
- Built: c.1873
- MPS: Lime Industry of Houston County, Tennessee
- NRHP reference No.: 04001229
- Added to NRHP: November 10, 2004

The Quarry Limekiln, near Erin, Tennessee, dating from around 1873, was listed on the National Register of Historic Places in 2004.

It is a "single masonry 'perpetual-burning' limekiln", built of limestone blocks on its exterior and with brick in its interior. It is about 22 feet (6.7 m) tall, on a base about 18 by 20.5 feet (5.5 m × 6.2 m) in size, tapering up to a top that is about 13 by 17 feet (4.0 m × 5.2 m).

It was deemed significant for its association with the lime industry in the history of Houston County (where the lime industry was the most significant industry) and the Middle Tennessee region.

It is located on State Route 49, approximately 0.25 miles east of Denmark Road.
