= Coldspring (company) =

American quarrier, fabricator, and manufacturer

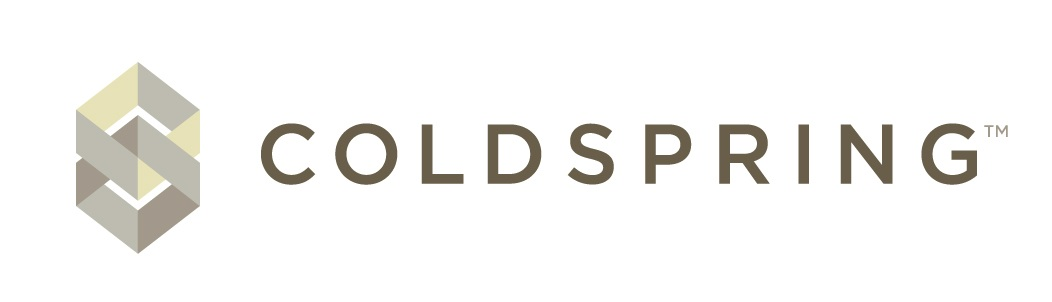
- Formerly: Cold Spring Granite Company
- Type: Privately owned
- Industry: Building Materials, Memorialization, Tooling
- Founded: 1898
- Founder: Henry Alexander
- Headquarters: Cold Spring, Minnesota
- Area served: North America
- Key people: Pat Alexander, Chairman; Mike O'Connor, CEO; Greg Flint, President & COO
- Products: Granite, Limestone, Sandstone, Bronze, Memorials
- Number of employees: Approximately 900
- Website: Coldspring

Coldspring is a quarrier and fabricator of granite and other natural stone and a bronze manufacturing company in the United States. Coldspring serves the memorials market, the design and architectural market and distributes slabs for the residential market, industrial products, raw quarry blocks, and diamond tools.

== History ==
In 1898 Scottish stonecutter Henry Nair Alexander founded the Rockville Granite Company. During the last decade of the nineteenth century, Alexander joined with a group of men from Rockville, Minnesota, to lease land with an outcropping of granite. Alexander died in 1913; his sons Patrick H. and John continued the company. In 1920, the sons moved the company five miles away from Rockville to the town of Cold Spring, Minnesota. This move built upon Henry’s single quarry, creating the Cold Spring Granite Company. In recent years, the company's offerings expanded and in 2013, the company name was changed to Coldspring.

Both Patrick H. and John expanded the business with their plan, which resulted in the company becoming the largest quarrier in the country by 1930.

== Products and industries served ==
Coldspring has quarries and works located in New York, Minnesota, South Dakota, Texas, California and Canada. Color choices include: Academy Black, Agate, Azalea, Carnelian, Charcoal Black, Diamond Pink, Fredericksburg Red, Iridian, Kasota Valley Limestone, Lac du Bonnet, Lake Placid Blue, Lake Superior Green, Mesabi Black, Mountain Green, Prairie Brown, Rainbow, Rockville Beige, Rockville White, Royal Sable, Sierra White, Sunset Beige, Sunset Red, Texas Pearl, Texas Pink and Texas Red.

Coldspring's stone products serve for applications such as commercial interiors and exteriors, landscaping, hardscaping, civic memorials and national monuments. Coldspring distributes slabs for the residential market, as well as industrial products, raw quarry blocks, jetty, rip-rap and diamond tools. Coldspring also serves cemeteries and memorial companies. Memorial products include bronze on granite markers, drilled granite bases, columbarium structures, granite benches, cremation memorials, pillars and boulders, standard and custom designed upright monuments, grass markers, slants and bevels, signs, bronze statuary, as well as other granite and bronze products. Further, Coldspring provides mausoleum design and construction for private estates and community mausoleums. Coldspring also provides construction services in the cemetery from design through installation. Services include pre-construction (master site planning, schematic/conceptual design, design development, construction documents, virtual design construction, building information modeling, estimating and pro formas), general construction, landscaping and site infrastructure.

== Sustainability initiatives ==
In December 2007, the construction of a new corporate headquarters, together with consolidated fabrication facilities in Cold Spring, Minnesota. Awarded LEED gold certification from the U.S. Green Building Council (USGBC) in 2008, the building has 31-percent less square footage than the former building.

Coldspring is a member of the Natural Stone Council (NSC) and President and COO, John Mattke, is past-chairman of the NSC's Committee on Sustainability, which has partnered with the University of Tennessee's Center for Clean Products in 2007 to provide research and define the environmental footprint of stone. For the center’s Natural Stone Industry Environmental Benchmarking Study, data was captured from both quarry and processing operations to characterize the environmental profile of the natural stone industry. Findings spurred continuing research on key issues ranging from water reclamation and consumption efficiency, identification of market niches and alternative uses for scrap stone, to the potential establishment of a corporate environmental policy for quarry closure; thereby compelling the development of industry best practices, life-cycle datasets and material fact sheets.

== Awards and recognition ==
Coldspring has been awarded the following honors: International Masonry Institute, Gold Trowel Award, 2001 Award of Merit - Commercial Exterior, Marble Institute of America - Franklin Delano Roosevelt Memorial, Washington, D.C., 2002 Special Pinnacle Award for Craftsmanship & Design, Marble Institute of America – Minneapolis Beautiful Project & “TEN” Sculpture, 2005 Special Pinnacle Award, Marble Institute of America – Stone Memorial, Tucker Award – City Garden in St. Louis, MO, Pinnacle Award – Lakewood Cemetery Garden Mausoleum in Minneapolis, MN.

== Notable projects ==
Coldspring has contributed to the following projects: Franklin Delano Roosevelt Memorial in Washington D.C., the Korean War Memorial in Washington, D.C., the National Japanese American Memorial in Washington, D.C., the Notre Dame Hesburgh Library “Touchdown Jesus” Mural in South Bend, Indiana, the Bank of America in San Francisco, California, the National D-Day Memorial in Bedford, Virginia, the Center for the Intrepid in San Antonio, Texas, and the Martin Luther King Jr. Memorial in Washington, D.C.
