= Thomas Marble Quarry Houses =

Historic houses in Pennsylvania, United States

- U.S. National Register of Historic Places
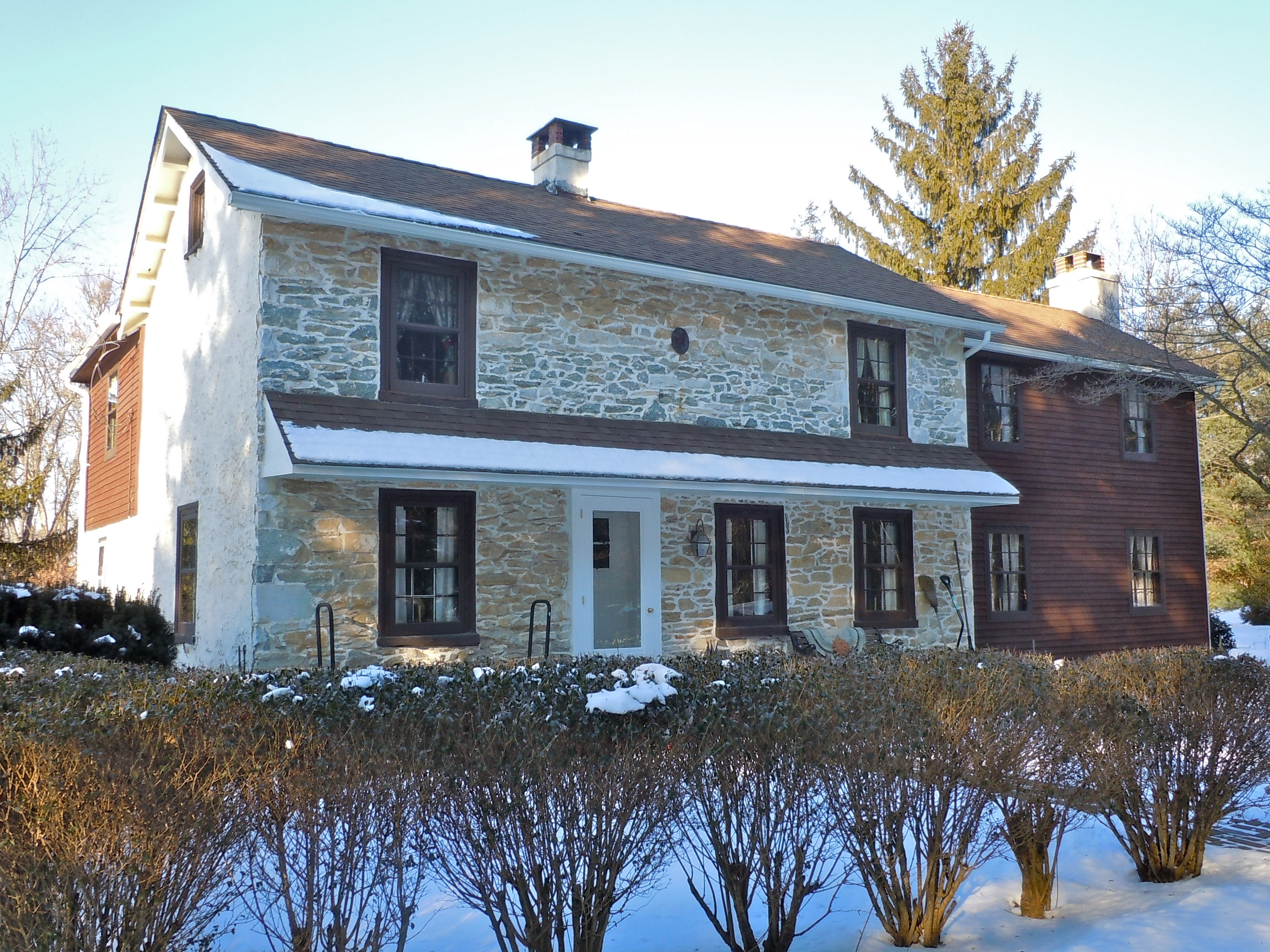
- Thomas Quarry House, January 2011

- Location within Pennsylvania Location within the United States
- Location: Quarry Lane, West Whiteland Township, Pennsylvania
- Coordinates: 40°01′12″N 75°38′19″W
- Area: 18 acres (7.3 ha)
- Built: c. 1833
- MPS: West Whiteland Township MRA
- NRHP reference No.: 84003306
- Added to NRHP: August 2, 1984

Thomas Marble Quarry Houses is a set of three historic homes located in West Whiteland Township, Chester County, Pennsylvania. They are the Quarry Master's House and two worker's houses. They are all stuccoed stone structures. The property includes the site of the quarry and vestiges of two lime kilns and ruins from the quarry operation.

It was listed on the National Register of Historic Places in 1984.
