= Cedar-Bank Works =

Archaeological site in Ohio, United States

- U.S. National Register of Historic Places
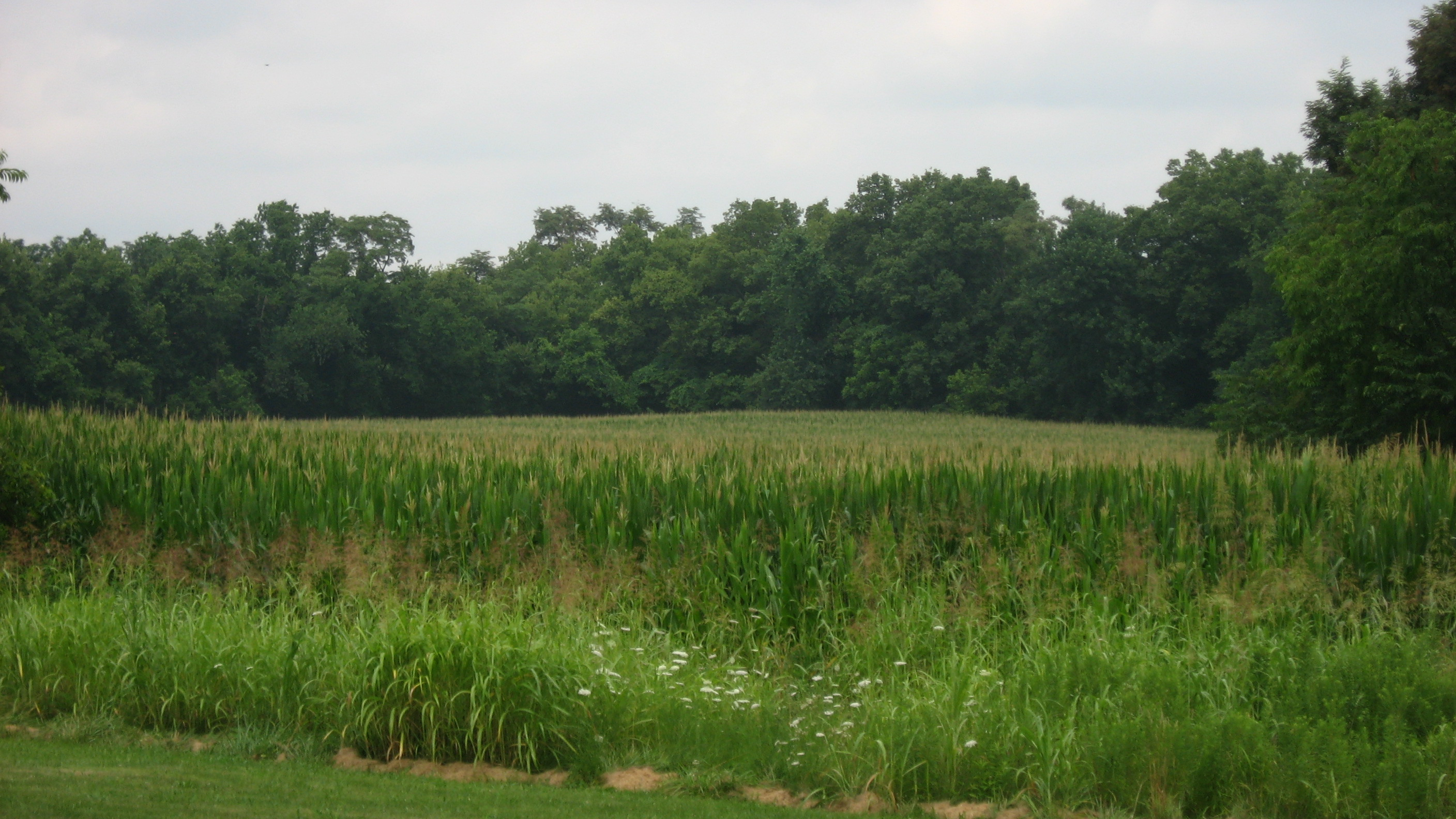
- Nearest city: Chillicothe, Ohio
- Area: 32 acres (13 ha)
- NRHP reference No.: 74001614
- Added to NRHP: February 15, 1974

Cedar-Bank Works is group of Adena culture earthworks located in Ross County, Ohio in the United States. It is located approximately five miles north of the town of Chillicothe, Ohio.

== History ==
Cedar-Bank is Adena in its design and style, and is believed to have been built before the sites at Hopewell Culture National Historical Park. It remains unknown what the date is on the site.

== Survey history ==
=== Squier and Davis: 1845 ===
The site was surveyed in 1845 by Ephraim George Squier and Edwin Hamilton Davis. They reported about their survey in their 1848 publication, Ancient Monuments of the Mississippi Valley. They describe the site as consisting of a "wall and an outer ditch, which constitute three sides of a parallelogram. The fourth side is protected by a natural bank or bluff, 70 feet high, and so steep as to admit of no ascent, except at one point where it has been gullied by the flow of water."

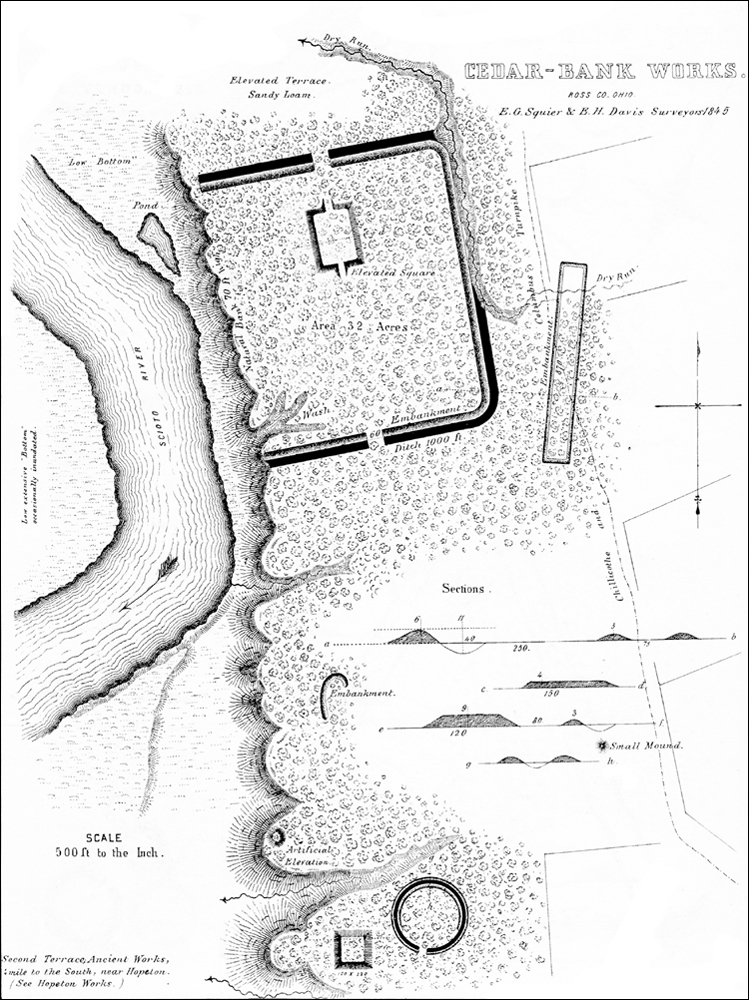
A survey map of the site in 1846, by Squier and Davis and featured in Ancient Monuments of the Mississippi Valley

They surveyed the three walls as measuring at six feet high with 40 foot bases. The ditches were noted as being five feet by 40 feet wide. The eastern wall was reported as having a ditch that traveled for two-thirds of its length. This ditch was measured at ranging from eight to ten feet deep. The eastern wall itself was 1,400 feet long. The other built walls, the northern and southern walls, were both the same size, measuring in at 1,050 feet in length. They were placed on right angles. The south ended at the hill and the north stopped 25 feet from the southern wall. Squier and Davis believed that a fourth wall may have been built, only to have been destroyed by the natural elements.

Two entrances were noted, one on the north side and the other on the south side, each placed in the center of each side. They describe a four foot tall "elevated square" as "covering the northern gateway and two hundred feet interior to it." The square is noted as being 250 feet by 150 feet wide. They compare the square to the pyramids located at the Marietta Earthworks. Squier and Davis described parallel walls, 300 feet away from the main site. The walls were measured at 870 feet in length and 70 feet apart from each other. The two walls merge and lack ditches. The two men noted that the walls were partially destroyed by the Chillicothe Turnpike that passed through the site. The undisturbed parts of the walls, which were in forested areas of the site, were two to three feet high.

They surveyed, a third of a mile south of the main work, a truncated pyramid along with a small circle. The pyramid is measured at 120 feet square at the base and nine feet tall. The pyramid's location matches the cardinal directions. They excavated the pyramid, and no remains were found. The circle is measured at 250 feet in diameter with a gateway on the south side of it. The gateway is 30 feet wide. There is a ditch inside the circle and an embankment, which almost matches the height of the circle wall on the side without the gateway. Squier and Davis note that they have seen this type of build in other works, but do not name which sites. This type of partially open circle would be described, by contemporary archaeologists as being a "C-form" earthwork. They complement the location of the pyramid and circle as having a "fine view" of the river and being "well chosen," by the builders. They believed that the land that the square and circle works were built on was intentionally smoothed out by the builders. They did note that they discovered "inconsiderable remains, consisting of small, low terraces, and little mounds and circles." No additional major mounds were discovered on the site.

Upon completion of their survey, Squier and Davis could not easily determine the use of the earthworks. They believed that the main works appeared to be fortifications. However, the large gateways on the site were "hardly consistent with the hypothesis of military origin." The men reported that there must have been some type of significance in the placement of walls, suggesting that the space was used for "celebration of certain games" or religious ceremony.

=== A casual analysis: Ohio Historical Society, 1902 ===
The Ohio Historical Society reported its findings on excavations at the site in the 1902 book, Archæological History of Ohio: The Mound Builders and Later Indians by Gerard Fowke. Fowke notes that when the site was built, the river most likely flowed high enough to be at the edge of the earthworks. He noted young white oak being found at the site and that, as of the time of publishing, no other excavations had taken place since Squier and Davis visited the site in 1845. Based on casual observation, Fowke noted that the "south wall had been worn away," but it is unknown what happened. He suggested that perhaps the river washed away the loose soil and gravel that the wall was built upon, causing it to fall apart. He also noted that the river was "much further away," than at the time Squier and Davis had visited. He theorizes that a ditch near "Prairie Run" may have been one source for the soil used to build the works.

He cites cultivation as the source of the walls being destroyed in most areas, showing a considerable change from the time that Squier and Davis had been there in 1845. He also states that the pyramid that Squier and Davis describe was described incorrectly by them. Fowke states that the grounds were not purposefully smoothed out by the builders, and that the ground is naturally like that and that the ground is no more special than the ground that surrounds it without works built upon it.
