= Marietta Earthworks =

Archaeological site in Ohio, United States

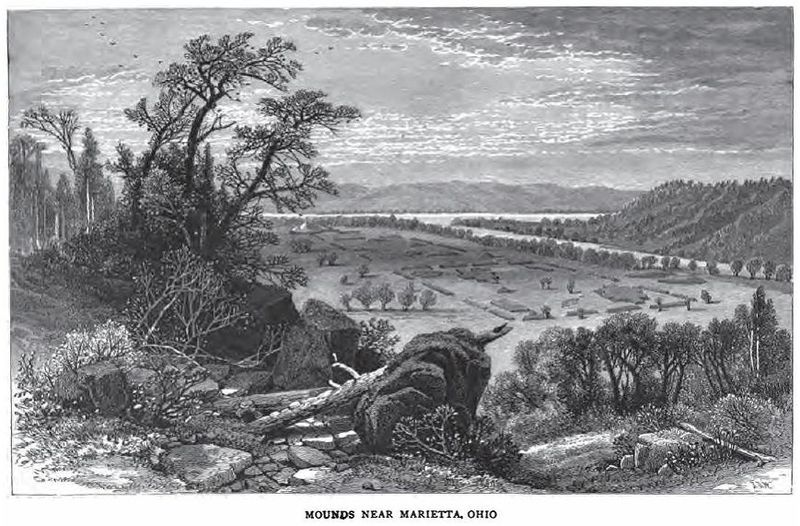
- Drawing of Marietta Earthworks

- Location within Ohio
- 39°25′12″N 81°27′7″W
- Cultures: Ohio Hopewell
- Location: Washington County, Ohio, USA
- Region: Washington County, Ohio

History
- Built: 100 BCE
- Abandoned: 500 CE

Site notes
- Architectural styles: Platform mounds, burial mound, enclosuress,

The Marietta Earthworks is an archaeological site located at the confluence of the Muskingum and Ohio Rivers in Washington County, Ohio, United States. Most of this Hopewellian complex of earthworks is now covered by the modern city of Marietta. Archaeologists have dated the ceremonial site's construction to approximately 100 BCE to 500 CE.

== Description ==
Early European American settlers gave the structures Latin names. The complex includes the Sacra Via (meaning "sacred way"), three walled enclosures, the Quadranaou, Capitolium (meaning "capital") and at least two other additional platform mounds, and the Conus burial mound and its accompanying ditch and embankment.

=== Capitolium ===
The Capitolium is a truncated pyramidal mound with three ramps leading to its summit. It is slightly smaller than the Quadranaou mound. Although not in pristine condition, it has been mostly preserved due to the construction of the Washington County Library on its summit in 1916. According to measurements and research done by archaeoastronomer William F. Romain in the 1990s, when the mound was constructed it was aligned to within about one degree with the winter solstice sunset.

=== Conus ===
The Conus, situated today in the Mound Cemetery, on or near the top of a ridge, is a large burial mound encompassed by an embankment and a ditch, much like a round barrow. A gap in the embankment and an earthen ramp across the ditch gives access to the base of the mound. When an earthen wall was constructed outside the ditch, as in this location, it means that the mound was for ceremonial use, not as a type of fortification. The mound today stands 30 feet (9.1 m) in height and is the sole intact feature of the earthworks. The ditch surrounding the mound is 15 feet (4.6 m) in width and 4 feet (1.2 m) deep, with its surrounding embankment measuring 20 feet (6.1 m) across its base and 585 feet (178 m) in circumference.

=== Enclosures and Sacra Via ===
The site has three large enclosures, surrounded by earthen embankments. The largest, enclosing approximately 50 acres, is on the northwestern end of the complex and is a rectangular enclosure with the Sacra Via ceremonial walled pathway leading down to the Muskingum River. Located within the enclosure were four large platform mounds, including the two largest at the site, the Quadranaou located in the western corner of the enclosure and the Capitolium located along the southeastern side. The two smallest mounds are located in the eastern and northern corners. The Sacra Via was a 680 feet (210 m) long by 150 feet (46 m) wide graded way that begins at the center of the southwestern side of the enclosure and ended at or near the Muskingum River. It was flanked on its side by embankments that are 10 feet (3.0 m) high at the enclosure and 20 feet (6.1 m) high at their termini. Sections of the Sacra Via are preserved as a parkway leading from Third Street to Sacra Via Park. As with the Quadranaou and the Capitolium mounds, research has shown that when the site was constructed the Sacra Via and the walls of the enclosure were aligned with the winter solstice sunset.

The second largest enclosure is located to the east of largest and encloses approximately 27 acres. It was made up of a series of 5 feet (1.5 m) high walls with ten gates, several being single openings, but two (located in the center of the southwest and northeast walls) were double openings. Eight mounds were positioned at the gates, with the double gates each having a single mound.

The third and smallest enclosure was a series of straight line embankments located in between the second enclosure and the berm surrounding the Conus mound.

=== Quadranaou ===
The Quadranaou was the largest of the platform mounds at the site and was originally 180 feet (55 m) in length by 32 feet (9.8 m) in width and stood 10 feet (3.0 m) in height. The mound had four graded ramps leading to the summit located at the midpoint of each side, each being 25 feet (7.6 m) in width and 60 feet (18 m) in length. The surviving remnant of the mound is currently preserved in "Quadranaou Park". According to research done in the 1990s, when the mound was constructed it was aligned to within two-tenths of one degree with the winter solstice sunset.

== Modern history ==
The site was first investigated in 1786 by Captain Jonathan Hart, the commander of Fort Harmar. Hart drew a plan of the site that appeared in the May 1787 issue of Columbian Magazine and conducted investigations into one of the mounds; his work is now thought to have been the first archaeological investigation in the state of Ohio. In 1788 Benjamin Franklin conjectured that the earthworks may have been built by members of the 1540 Hernando de Soto expedition through southeastern North America. The next investigations were by Rufus Putnam in 1788 and Reverend Manasseh Cutler in 1789 as they began surveying and founding the modern city of Marietta. Cutler had several trees growing out of the earthworks chopped down so he could count the growth rings; determining that the trees had begun to grow 441 years earlier in approximately 1347. This tree ring data, coupled with the fact that the trees had been preceded by another such round of growth of at least equal age, argued against the de Soto theory and pushed the date for the construction of the earthworks back at 1000 yrs before the 1780s. Given this greater age, others later theorized (also incorrectly) that the mounds had been built by groups as various as the Toltecs from Central America and Scythians from Europe.

Between 1788 and 1796 members of the Ohio Company of Associates made provisions for the mounds to be surveyed and protected, gave them their Latin names, and placed the mounds under the domain of the future mayor of Marietta. This kept the mounds relatively secure for almost a century before the residents of Marietta began dismantling them for various construction projects. In 1801 Mound Cemetery was founded at the Conus mound, preserving it from future destruction. The cemetery is thought to house the graves of more American Revolutionary War officers than any other.

The complex was again surveyed and drawn in 1838 by Samuel R. Curtis (at the time a civil engineer for the state of Ohio). This survey was incorrectly attributed to Charles Whittlesey by E. G. Squier and E. H. Davis in their Ancient Monuments of the Mississippi Valley, published by the Smithsonian Institution in 1848. At the time the complex "included a large square enclosure surrounding four flat-topped pyramidal mounds, another smaller square, and a circular enclosure with a large burial mound at its center."

The Sacra Via was mostly destroyed in 1882, with the resulting clay being used for the making of bricks. Most of the earthworks' walls had also been demolished by this point for similar construction projects.

The Conus mound was listed on the National Register of Historic Places on February 23, 1973 as the Mound Cemetery Mound, site listing number 73001549. In 1990 archaeologists from the Cleveland Museum of Natural History excavated a section of the Capitolium mound and determined that the mound was definitely constructed by peoples of the Hopewell Culture.

== Gallery ==
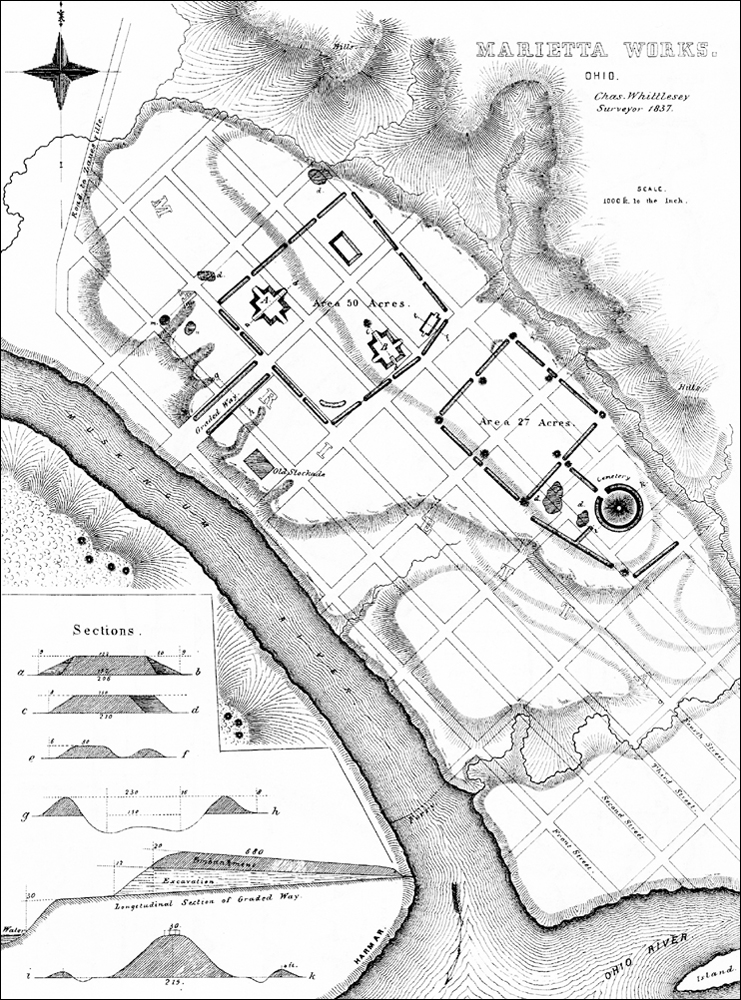
Survey of Marietta Earthworks, 1838

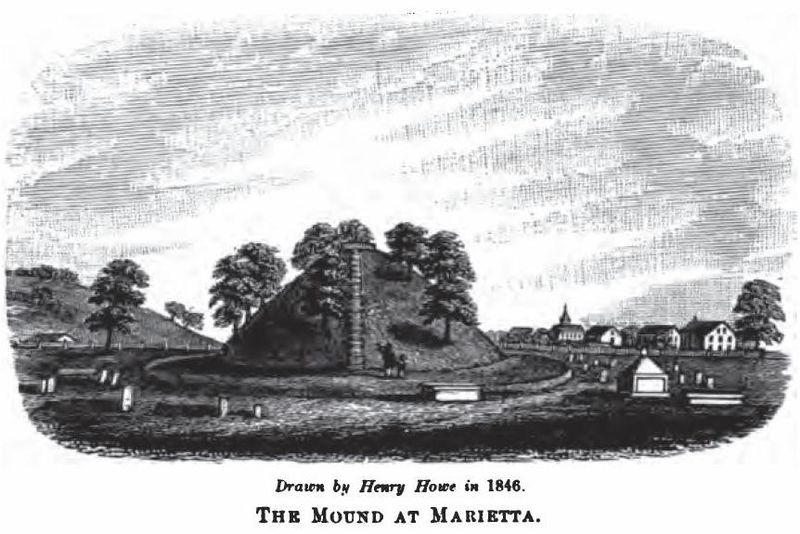
Drawing of Conus in Mound Cemetery, 1846

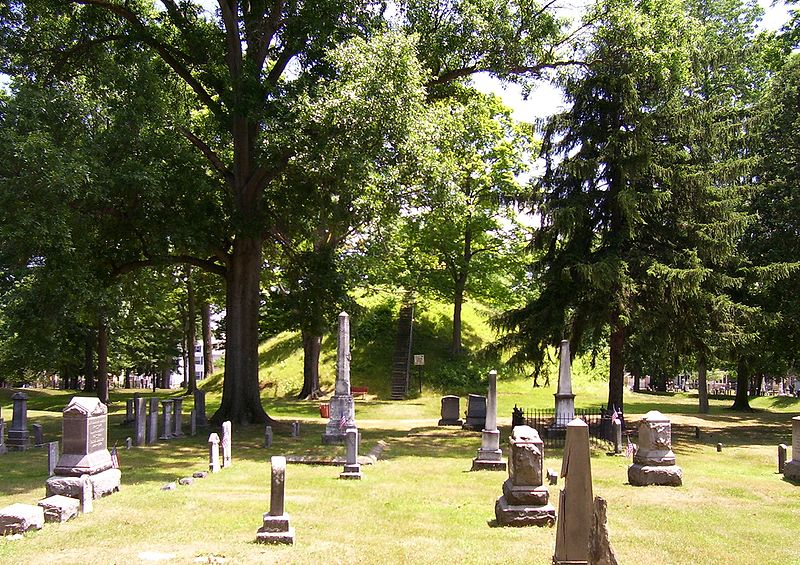
Conus in 2007

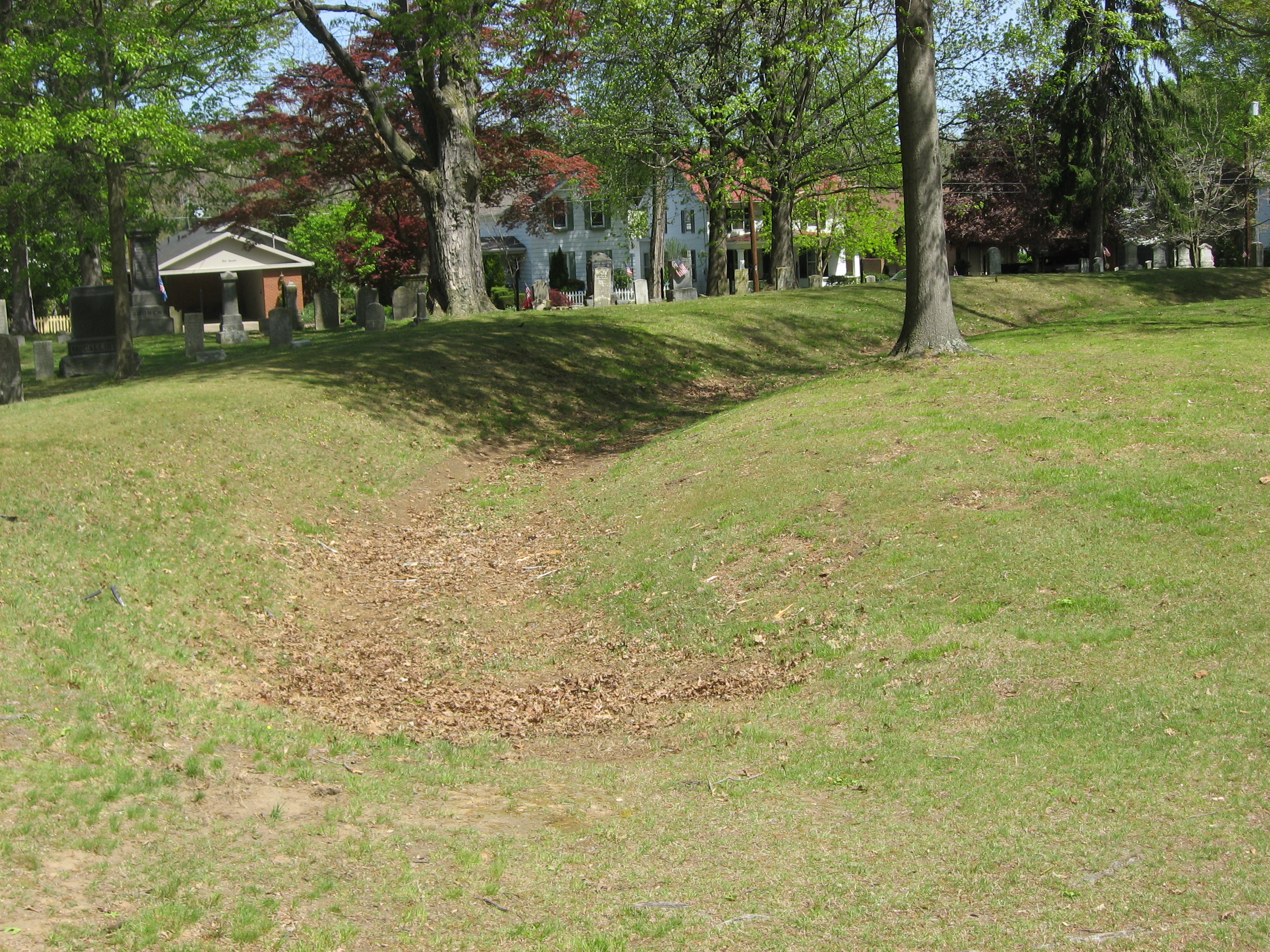
Ditch and embankment around the Conus

== See also ==
- Portsmouth Earthworks
- List of Hopewell sites
