= Dunlap Works =

Coordinates: 39°17′09″N 84°39′29″W

- Location within Ohio today
- Interactive map of Dunlap Works
- Type: Mound
- Cultures: Ohio Hopewell culture
- Location: Ross County, Ohio

Site notes
- Material: Earth
- Architectural style: Earthworks
- Archaeologists: Squier & Davis

The Dunlap Works are a group of Hopewell tradition earthworks located in Ross County, Ohio in the United States. It is located approximately 6 miles (9.7 km) north of the city of Chillicothe, Ohio on the left bank of the Scioto River. The site should not be confused with the earthworks in Hamilton County on the Great Miami River near Dunlap's Station, the former site of a pioneer fort.

== Survey history ==
Ephraim George Squier and Edwin Hamilton Davis visited the site in 1846. They shared the analysis of their survey in their 1848 publication, Ancient Monuments of the Mississippi Valley. In their survey of the site, they reported that one work is shaped as a rhomboid. Off of the rhomboid work was an avenue. One side of the avenue headed southwest 1,130 feet. The other side was shorter and ended at a small circle. The west side of the work was a plain elevated a number of feet above the rhomboid itself. An extension of the work was 80 feet wide and 280 in length. The plain overlooked another, larger earthwork, with a large gateway providing access.

Towards the end of the avenue stopped 60 feet short of another gateway. The gateway was 120 feet wide. The end of the avenue had a small mound. An additional mound was just south of the main work. That mound was surrounded by a ditch and a low embankment. Another half a mile away was a group of mounds close to the avenue on the lower level. One mound was truncated at 15 feet high and 100 feet in diameter. At the truncated top, it was 50 feet in diameter. Squier and Davis noted that the lower level may have suffered from flooding on occasion. In their 1848 report, they share that the truncated mound was a respite from a flood for a family, their horses, cattle and belongings during a flood of 1832.

That mound was excavated and human skeletons were found two to five feet deep into the mound. Squier and Davis believed that the skeletons those of "modern Indians." Sherds and shells were discovered within and around the mound. Pottery was also discovered during modern cultivation. Squier and Davis hypothesized that the pottery was made by "modern" Native peoples.
