= 1848 in archaeology =

Below are notable events in archaeology that occurred in 1848.

== Explorations ==
- First scientific expedition visits Tikal, Guatemala

== Publications ==
- Ancient Monuments of the Mississippi Valley by Ephraim George Squier and Edwin Hamilton Davis
- First volume of Austen H. Layard's Nineveh and its Remains
- Final volume of Lord Kingsborough's 9 volume Antiquities of Mexico

== Finds ==
- By March 3 - Gibraltar 1, a female skull from Forbes' Quarry in Gibraltar, later identified as Neanderthal, is found by Capt. Edmund Flint RN
- May 3 - The Benty Grange hanging bowl and Benty Grange helmet from a tumulus on Benty Grange farm in the Peak District of England
- Neolithic hoard at East Ayton in England

== See also ==
- List of years in archaeology
- 1847 in archaeology
- 1849 in archaeology
