= Charles Whittlesey (geologist) =

American geologist (1808–1886)

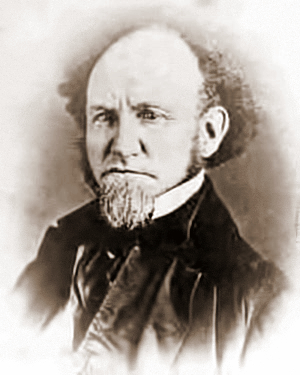
- Born: October 4, 1808; Southington, Connecticut
- Died: October 18, 1886 (aged 78); Cleveland, Ohio
- Military career
- Allegiance: United States of America; Union
- Branch: United States Army; Union Army
- Service years: 1831–1832 (U.S. Army); 1861–1862 (Volunteer Army)
- Rank: Colonel, U.S.V.
- Unit: 20th Ohio Infantry
- Commands: 3rd Brigade, 3rd Division, Army of the Tennessee
- Conflicts: Black Hawk War: Battle of Bad Axe; American Civil War: Battle of Rich Mountain; Battle of Fort Donelson; Battle of Shiloh; Defense of Cincinnati
- Other work: geologist

Signature
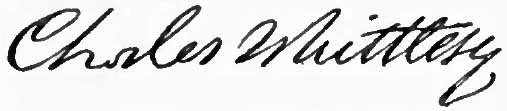

Charles Whittlesey (October 4, 1808 - October 18, 1886) was a soldier, geologist, historian, and an investigator of mounds relics of the United States. He is described by Ephraim George Squier and Edwin Hamilton Davis in their book Ancient Monuments of the Mississippi Valley as a "zealous investigator" in the field of "American antiquarian research."

== Biography ==
Whittlesey graduated from the United States Military Academy in 1831, and was assigned to the 5th Infantry Regiment. In 1832 he was stationed at Fort Howard, Wisconsin, and after serving in the Black Hawk War, he resigned his commission on September 30 of the same year. After studying law, he followed that profession in Cleveland, Ohio and from 1836 to 1837, was editorially connected with the Cleveland Herald.

In 1837 Whittlesey was appointed assistant geologist of the State of Ohio, under William W. Mather, and given charge of the topographical and mathematical parts of that survey, which disclosed the rich coal and iron deposits of eastern Ohio that are the foundation of its manufacturing industries. At this time, he also carefully examined and measured several of the works of the Mound Builders, and his plans and notes of twenty of these remains were embodied in Edwin Hamilton Davis and E. G. Squier's Ancient Monuments of the Mississippi Valley.

From 1847 until 1851 he was engaged by the U.S. Government in making a mineralogical and geological survey of the region about Lake Superior and the upper Mississippi River. Subsequently, he was professionally engaged as a mining engineer in Michigan, Wisconsin, and Minnesota, and in 1858 became associated in the geological work of the survey of Wisconsin. In February 1861, he was enrolled in a company that tendered its services to Gen. Winfield Scott to escort the President-elect Abraham Lincoln to Washington, D.C.

He was made assistant quartermaster general on the staff of the Governor of Ohio on April 17, 1861, and during the Western Virginia Campaign acted as chief engineer of the Ohio troops. At the expiration of his three months' service he was appointed colonel of the 20th Ohio Infantry on August 15, 1861, and detailed as chief engineer of the Department of the Ohio, with charge of planning and constructing the defenses of Cincinnati. He was present at the Battle of Fort Donelson, where he led his regiment, and after the surrender was sent to north in charge of over 10,000 Confederate prisoners. At the Battle of Shiloh, he commanded the 3rd brigade of Maj. Gen. Lewis Wallace's division, but failing health compelled his retirement from active service, and he resigned on April 19, 1862. Whittlesey returned to service in September 1862, serving on Wallace's staff, providing assistance directing civilian and military labor for the defense of Cincinnati. Following the passing of the Confederate threat to the city, Whittlesey again returned to civilian life.

He then resumed the geological exploration in the Lake Superior and upper Mississippi basin, and continued his literary labors. In 1867, he was active in the founding of the Western Reserve and Northern Ohio Historical Society, of which he was president until his death in 1886. He was elected a member of the American Antiquarian Society in 1870.

Due to his work describing early North American indigenous people, an archaeological designation, the Whittlesey culture, describing people who lived in Northeast Ohio from A.D. 1000 to 1600, was named in his honor.

== Works ==
Whittlesey's bibliography included about 200 titles. In addition to his reports for the geological surveys, he published in the “Smithsonian Contributions”:

- Historical collections of Ohio : containing a collection of the most interesting facts, traditions, biographical sketches, anecdotes, etc. (1848)
- Descriptions of Ancient Works in Ohio (Washington, 1851)
- On Fluctuations of Level in the North American Lakes (1860)
- Ancient Mining on the Shores of Lake Superior (1863)
- On the Fresh-Water Glacial Drift in the Northwestern States (1866)

He is also the author of:

- Life of John Fitch, in Sparks's “American Biography” (Boston, 1845)
- Early History of Cleveland and Vicinity (Cleveland, 1867)
