= Quiverheart Gorge =

Nature sanctuary in Ohio, US

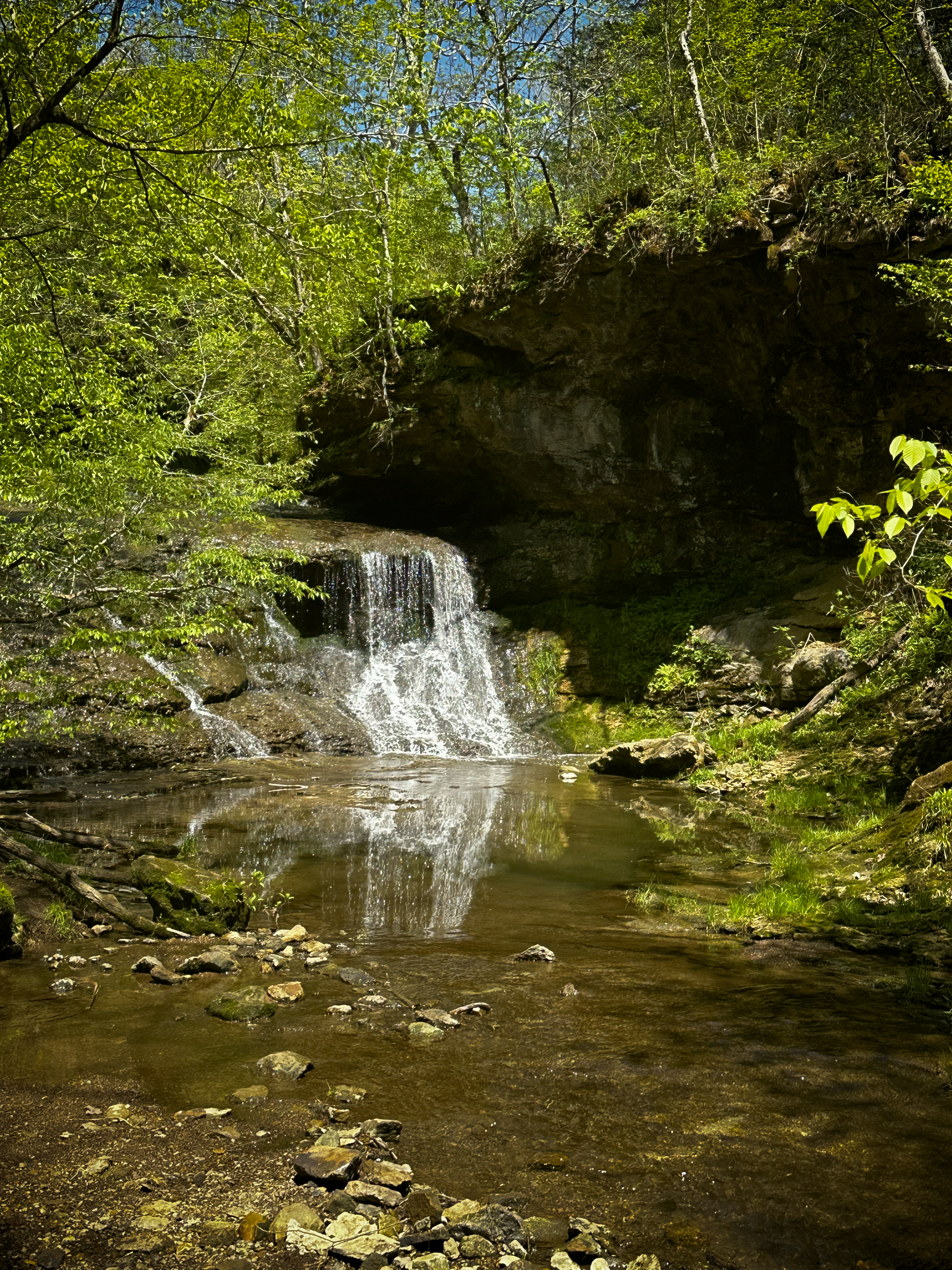
- Quiverheart Falls, the largest waterfall in the Arc of Appalachia preserve system
- Interactive map of Quiverheart Gorge
- Coordinates: 38°54′25″N 83°24′30″W
- Area: 99 acres (40.06 ha)
- Created: 2022
- Operator: Arc of Appalachia
- Website: www.arcofappalachia.org/quiverheart-gorge

The Quiverheart Gorge Nature Preserve is a 99-acre (40 ha) nature sanctuary located south of Peebles, Ohio, United States. The preserve protects a deep dolomite gorge with unique geological formations and rare plant communities. It is also home to Quiverheart Falls, which is recognized as the largest waterfall within the Arc of Appalachia preserve system.

== History ==
The preserve was established by David and Kim Baker on land they donated in memory of David's late son, Matthew Baker. It formally opened to the public in 2022 through a permit system.

The name "quiverheart" originally came from a horse farm that David Baker and his son Matthew started in 2000. They wanted a name that fit the property, and Matthew told his dad, "when I'm riding my horses, it makes my heart quiver." Tragically, Matthew passed away in a car accident when he was 16. In 2022, David and his wife partnered with the Arc of Appalachia to create the preserve, keeping the name "quiverheart" to honor Matthew.

== Geology ==
The preserve protects a deep canyon carved into Silurian dolomite and Ordovician shale, geological strata characteristic of the Western Allegheny Plateau transition zone. This dramatic rock weathering has created steep bluff walls, rock shelters, and narrow gorges. The primary feature of the system is Quiverheart Falls, a 15 to 20 foot waterfall cascading over rocky dolomite ledges. It is recognized as the largest waterfall within the Arc of Appalachia preserve system.

Lime-rich soils derived from weathered dolomite support unique calciphilic (lime-loving) plant communities, including rare prairie species such as prairie dock and pale spiked lobelia. Fauna in the preserve include various avian species, including red-tailed hawk.

== Trails ==
- Quiverheart Falls trail, a 2.0 miles (3.2 km) loop trail
- Whispering Fern trail extends the hike by 1.25 miles (2.01 km)
