= Serpent Mound =

Precontact effigy mound in Ohio, United States

- Great Serpent Mound
- U.S. National Register of Historic Places
- U.S. National Historic Landmark
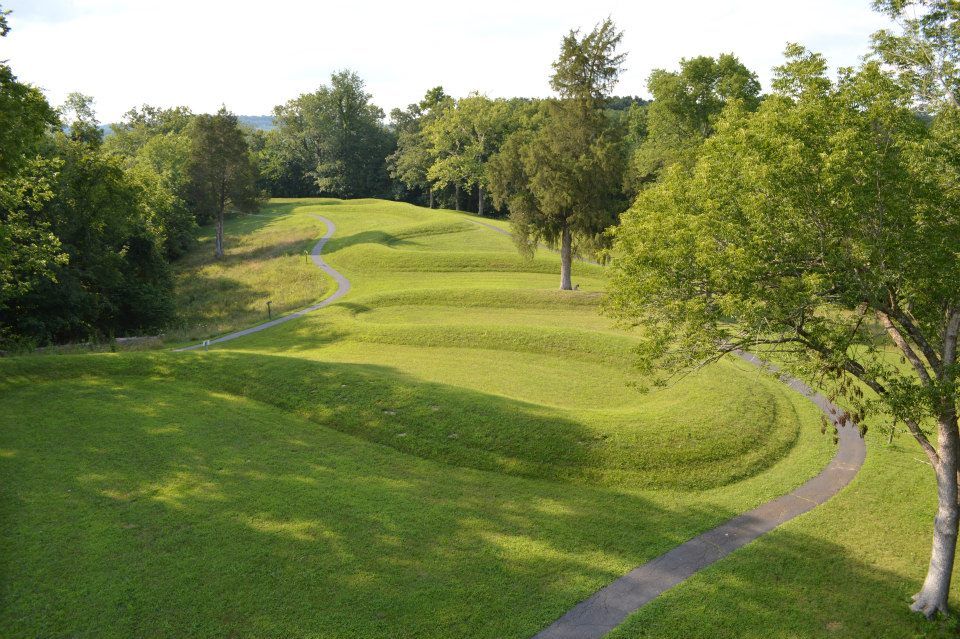
- The Great Serpent Mound – ancient Native American effigy in Adams County, Ohio
- Interactive map of Great Serpent Mound
- Nearest city: Peebles, Ohio
- Coordinates: 39°01′35″N 83°25′51″W
- NRHP reference No.: 66000602
- Added to NRHP: October 15, 1966

The Great Serpent Mound is a 1,348-feet-long (411m), four-feet-high precontact effigy mound located in Peebles, Ohio, United States. It was built on what is known as the Serpent Mound crater plateau, running along the Ohio Brush Creek in Adams County, Ohio. The mound is the largest serpent effigy known in the world.

The first published surveys of the mound, by E. G. Squier and Edwin Hamilton Davis, were featured in their 1848 study Ancient Monuments of the Mississippi Valley, commissioned by the Smithsonian Institution.

The United States Department of the Interior designated the mound as a National Historic Landmark in 1966. It is maintained by the Ohio History Connection, a nonprofit organization dedicated to preserving historical sites in Ohio.

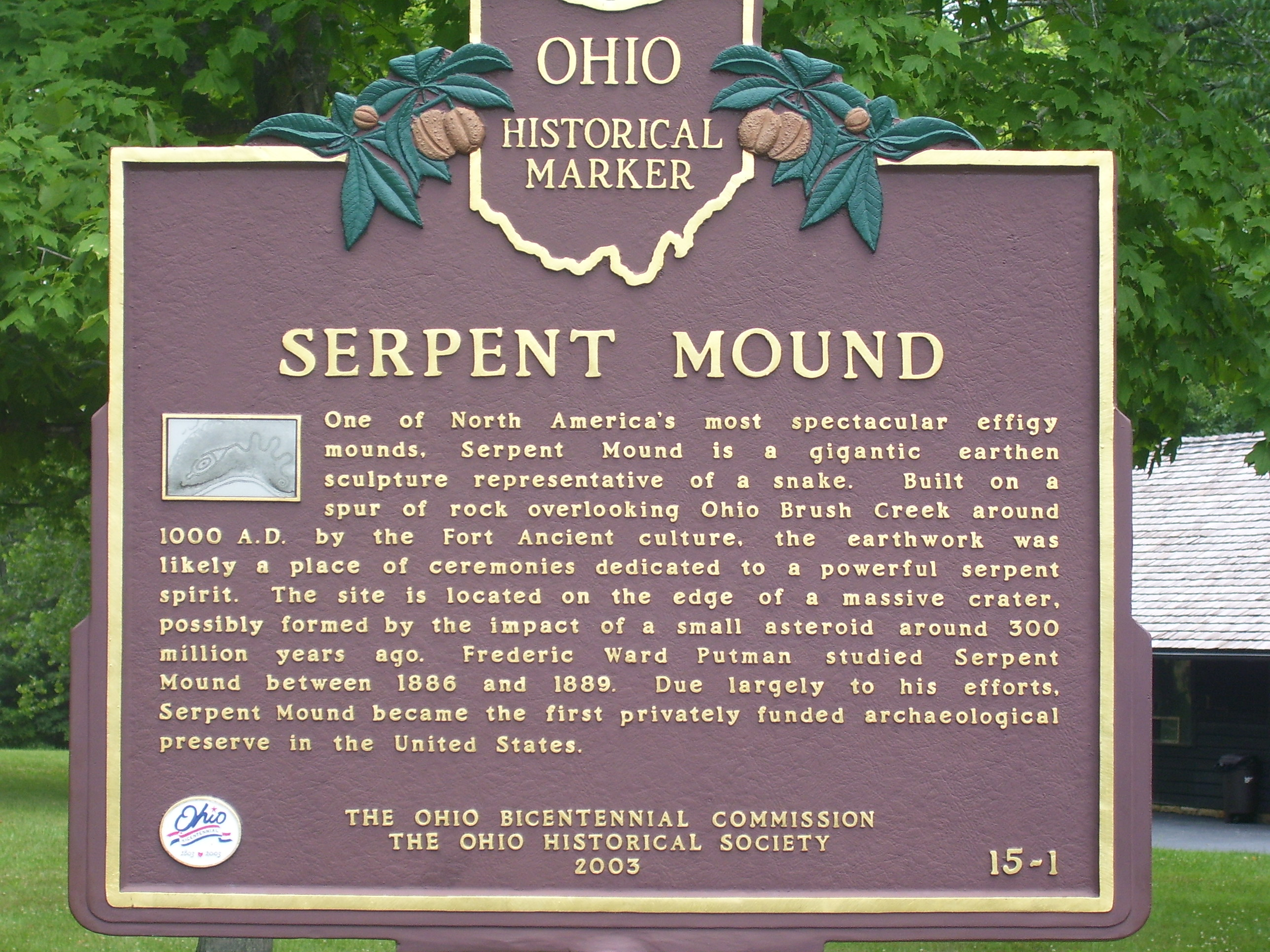
Ohio historical marker

== Description ==
Effigy mounds have been constructed independently by several cultures. The significance of Serpent Mound is based on its size and historical relevance. Made up of three parts, Serpent Mound extends over 1,348 ft (411 m) in length, varying from 9 in (23 cm) to more than 3 ft (91 cm) in height. The mound stands with a width varying between 22 and 24 ft (6.7 and 7.3 m) based on the section. Serpent Mound conforms to the surrounding land, as it was built on a bluff above the Ohio Brush Creek. The mound winds back and forth for more than eight hundred feet, with its tail coiling in seven areas throughout the mound. The mound features a triple-coiled tail at the end of the structure, often viewed as a benchmark of the mound. Yellowish clay and ash make up the main constituents of the mound, with a layer of rocks and soil reinforcing the outer layer.

Ohio Brush Creek below the bluff at Serpent Mound, Adams County, Ohio, 2026

Squier and Davis interpreted the structure as an open-mouth head of a [serpent] that nearly engulfs an east-facing hollow oval feature and is 120-foot (37 m) long. Squier and Davis believed the oval feature may represent an egg, with an apparent depiction of the snake consuming it. Archaeologist J.P. McLean identified the mound as the body of a frog. The western side of the effigy features a triangular mound approximately 31.6 ft (9.6 m) at its base and long axis. Similar serpent effigies exist in Serpent Mounds Park in Ontario and at Skelmorie in Scotland.

=== Serpent Mound impact crater ===
The mound is located on the site of a meteorite impact site known as the Serpent Mound crater. The crater is around 8.7 miles (14 km) in diameter and was formed 252–330 million years ago.

In 2003, the Ohio Department of Natural Resources formed a team of geologists to corroborate the meteorite impact origin of the structure at the Serpent Mound. A previous 1975 survey by S.P. Reidel provided them with a background of information pertaining to the site. This has led archaeologists to believe that the topographic expression of the crater has been completely erased by erosion.

== Origin and chronology ==
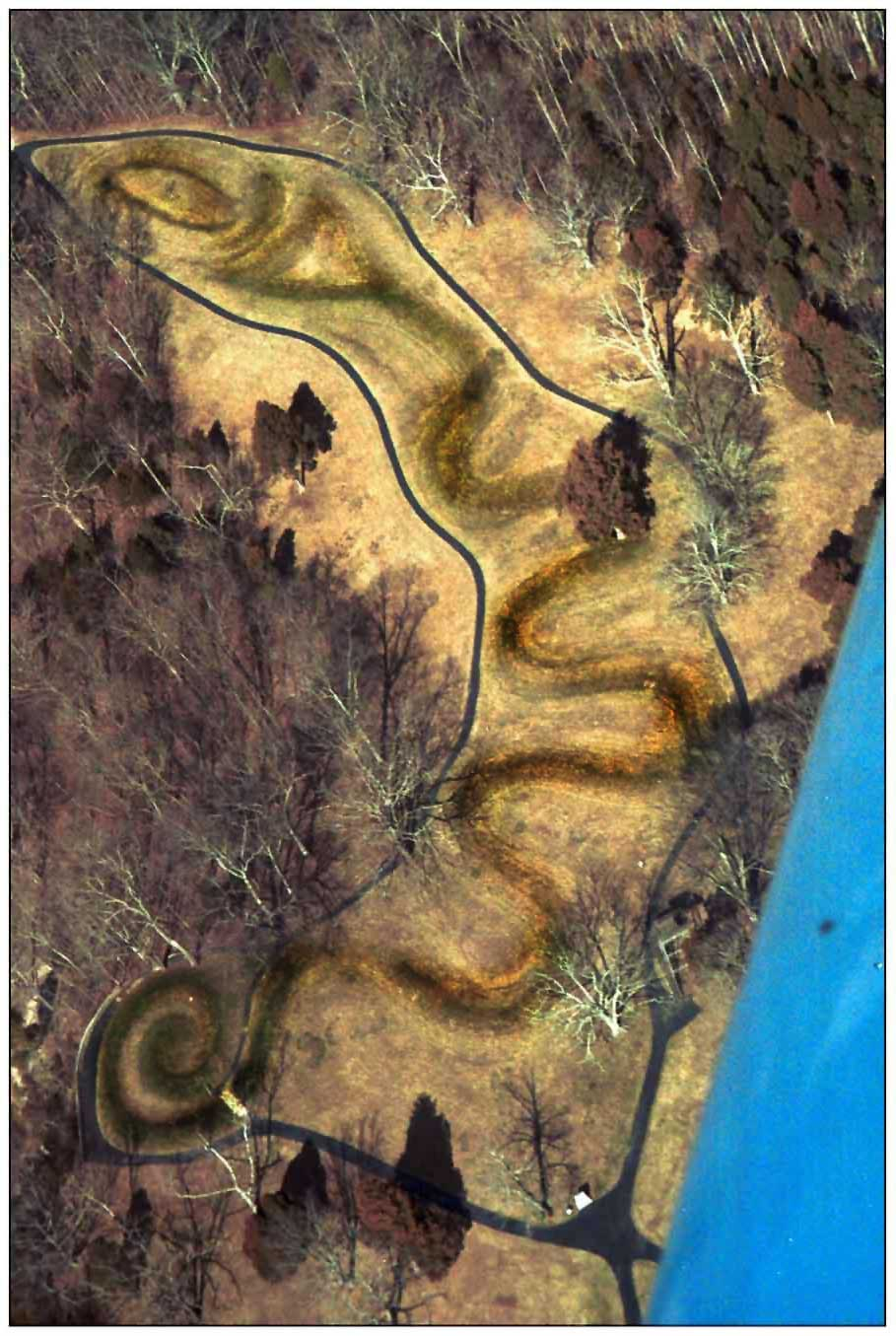
Serpent Mound (aerial view), 2002

Throughout the 20th century, anthropologists and archaeologists disputed whether peoples of the Adena or Fort Ancient archaeological cultures had created the Serpent Mound. In 2014, radiocarbon dating determined the mound was built in 300 BCE by the Adena peoples. This date was corroborated in 2019. Additionally, it was found that the mound was rebuilt or repaired around 1100 CE during the Fort Ancient period.

These dates were later challenged by archaeologist Brad Lepper, who published a response questioning the attribution of construction to the Adena culture. According to Lepper, material the team dated was not charcoal, but “organic sediment”. Moreover, the samples were obtained from soil cores and not an exposed stratigraphic profile. Archaeologist Peter Steen Henriksen and his colleagues have demonstrated that such dates can be as much as 3,000 years older than the actual age of a mound. Lepper argues the Adena culture is not known to have built effigy mounds or to have used serpent symbolism in their art, whereas the Fort Ancient culture built the Alligator Effigy Mound in Granville, Ohio, and frequently depicted serpents in their art. Lepper et al. concluded that the best available data indicated that Serpent Mound was built by the Fort Ancient culture. The Serpent Mound in Canada has been dated to more than 2,000 years old, and has also been linked to the Adena culture.

== Prehistory of Ohio ==
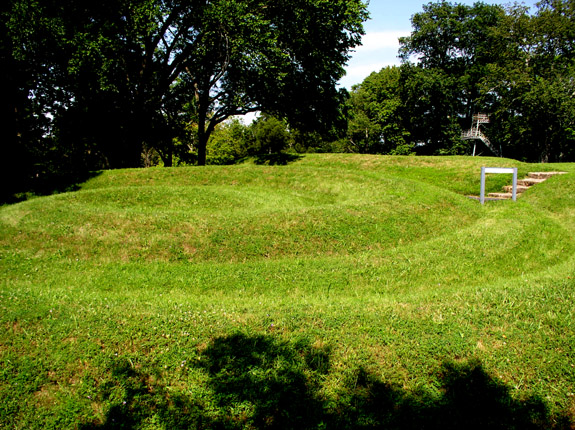
The spiral at the tail of the Serpent Mound

The Woodland period (800 BCE–1200 CE) is known for its rich ritual and artistic life and well-developed villages. The period is well known for many earthworks and mounds built during the time. During the early and middle woodland period, the Adena culture and Hopewell tradition flourished during the Early and Middle Woodland periods, and the addition of agriculture enabled the population of the Woodland people to expand dramatically. Several groups of the Woodland people lived in larger villages, surrounded by defensive walls or ditches. Ceremonial and artistic endeavors waned during the Late Woodland period, as did trading with other groups. Many of the earthworks and effigy mounds were built early in this period. Construction of mounds by cultures in the area stagnated until the late precontact period (900–1650 CE).

== Cultures of the Midwest ==
=== Adena culture ===
The Adena culture consisted of the pre-contact Native Americans who lived in what would become the states of Kentucky, Indiana, Pennsylvania, West Virginia, and Ohio. The majority of these peoples inhabited the Scioto River and Hocking River valleys in southern Ohio and the Kanawha River Valley near present-day Charleston, West Virginia. This period is often referred to as the Early Woodland period, ranging between 800 BCE and 1 CE. The name “Adena” refers to the shared culture of the peoples rather than to a singular group or tribe.

Archaeologists attribute two of the mounds at the site to the Adena culture as a whole, although they are unsure which specific tribes inhabited the land. The term "culture" encompasses similarities in artifact style, architecture, and other cultural practices, allowing archaeologists to distinguish the Adena culture from other cultures in the region at different time periods. The Adena Mound site became the "type site" of the regional culture that is used by anthropologists.

=== Fort Ancient Culture ===
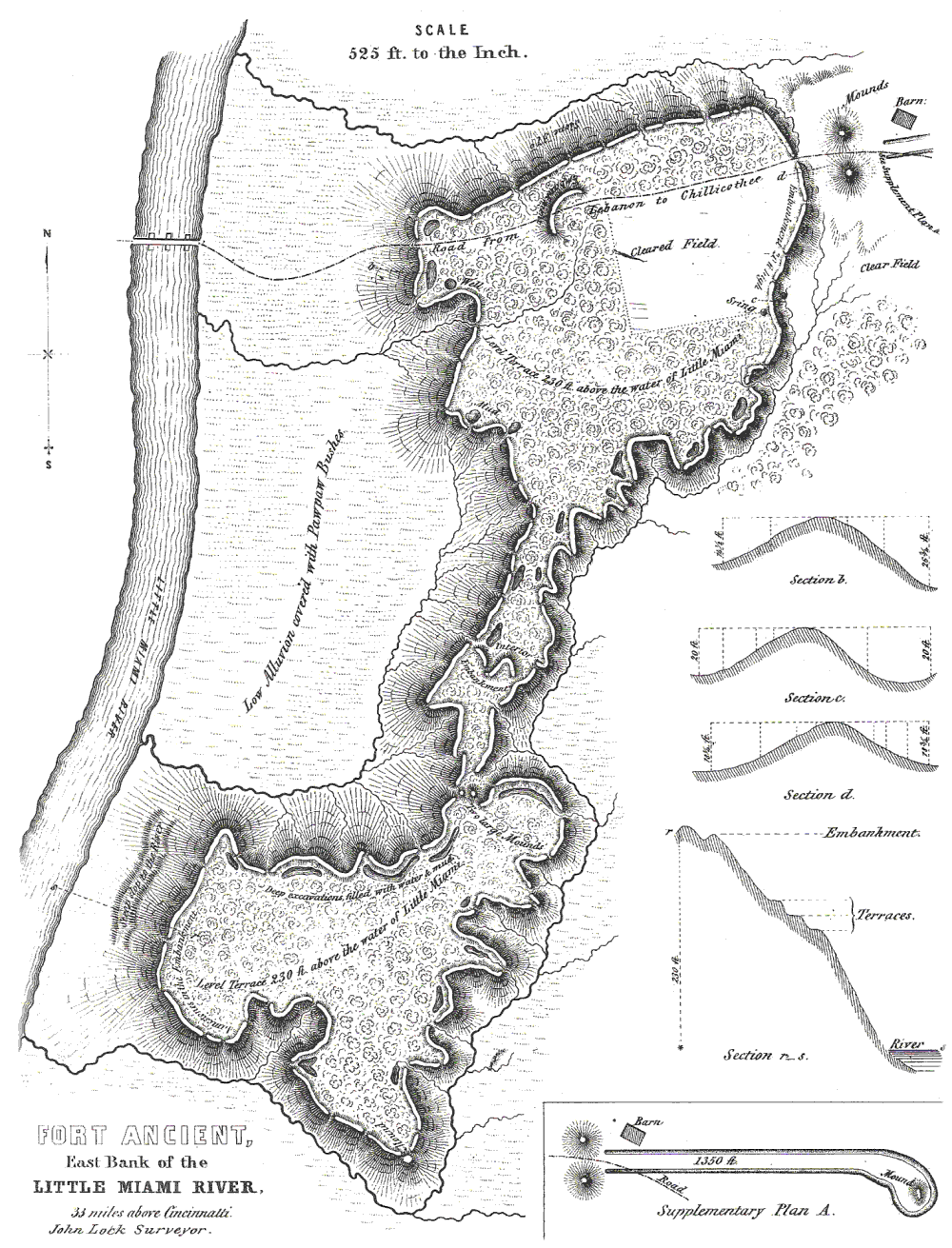
Map of Fort Ancient from 1848

The Fort Ancient Culture refers to the peoples who predominantly inhabited land near the Ohio River valley in a culture that flourished from 1000 to 1750 CE. These civilizations flourished in the modern-day regions of southern Ohio, northern Kentucky, southeastern Indiana, and western West Virginia. The Fort Ancient tribes are often referred to as a "sister culture" of the Mississippian culture. Along with their relation to the Mississippian culture, evidence suggests that the Fort Ancient Culture were not the direct descendants of the Hopewell tradition.

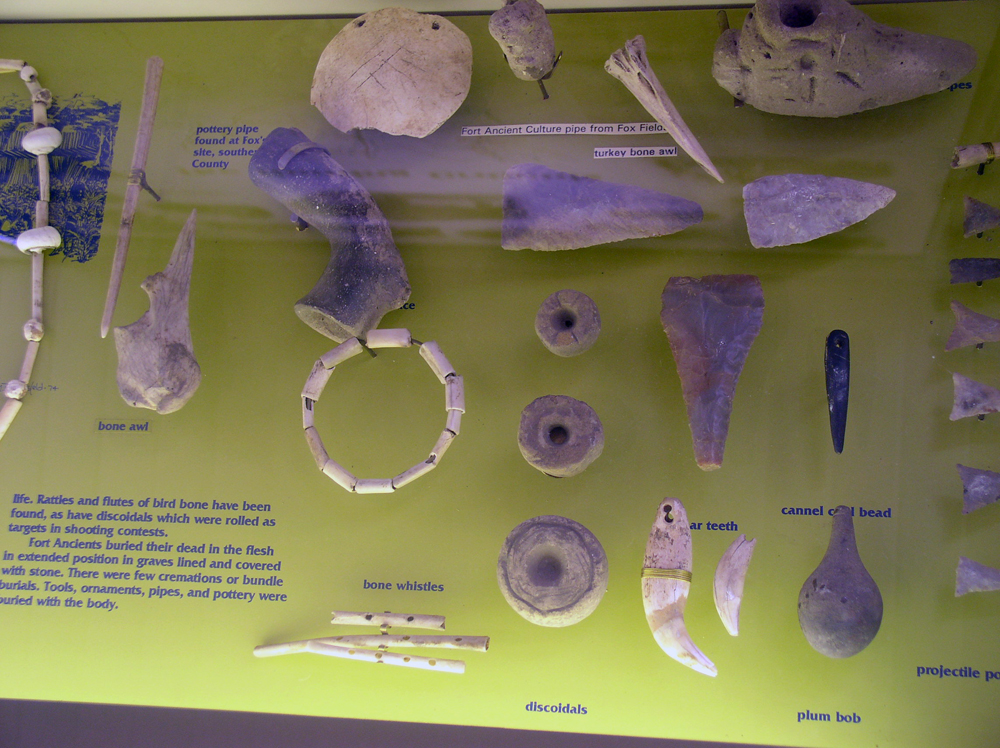
Fort Ancient tools found in Maysville, Kentucky

In 1996, the team of Robert V. Fletcher and Terry L. Cameron (under the supervision of the Ohio Historical Society's Bradley T. Lepper) reopened a trench created by Frederic Ward Putnam of Harvard University more than 100 years before. They found a few pieces of charcoal in what they believed to be an undisturbed portion of the Serpent Mound. When the team conducted carbon dating studies on the charcoal pieces, two yielded a date of ca. 1070 CE, with the third piece dating to 2920+/-65 years BP (before the present). The third date, ca. 2900 BP, was recovered from a core sample below the cultural modification level. The first two dates place the Serpent Mound within the realm of the Fort Ancient culture. The third dates the mound back to very early Adena culture or before.

== Interpretations ==
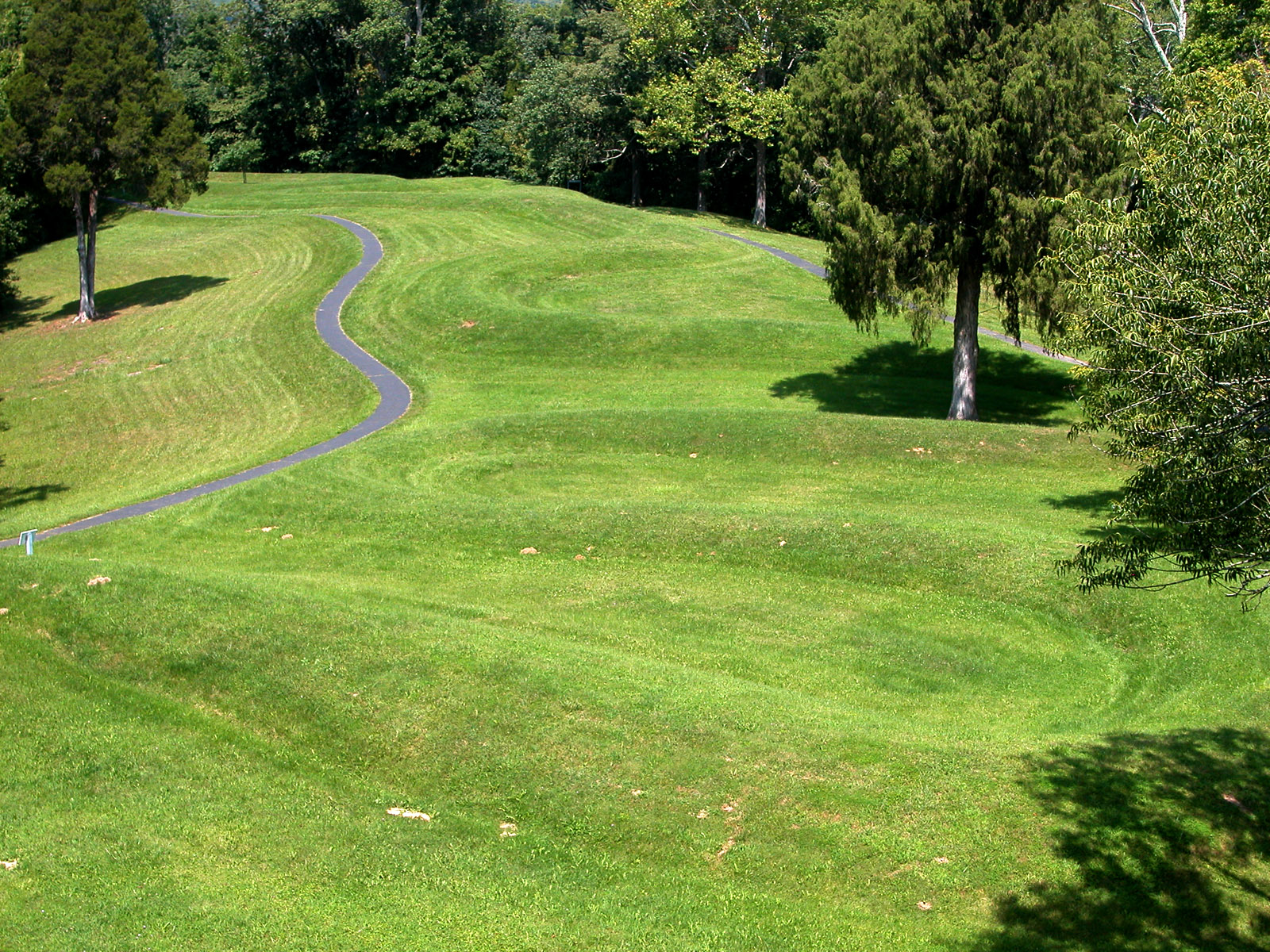
The curvature of the Serpent Mound

According to archaeologist Brad Lepper, Serpent Mound may be a depiction of a Dhegihan Siouan origin story of the Great Serpent "Toothy Mouth”, lord of the Beneath World, who impregnated the First Woman.

According to Woodward and McDonald's interpretation:

“Serpent Mound has given rise to a rich, diverse, and dynamic body of folk and scientific lore — there is no shortage of thoughts about how the effigy came to exist or, perhaps more importantly, why. At one time this earthen serpent was considered by some people with Christian affinity to be a mark of God that indicated the location of the Garden of Eden and served as a reminder of his moral authority. Today, New Age pilgrims find power and enlightenment, traditional views revere unrevealed distant purpose and perspective, and others seek meaning in geometric relationships between mounds and astronomical concurrences.”

— Woodward & McDonald, Indian Mounds of the Middle Ohio Valley, p.118

From assumptions of a construction date around 1070 AD, some archaeologists speculate that the appearance of Halley's Comet in 1066 could have influenced the construction of the mound.

=== Alignments ===
In 1987, Clark and Marjorie Hardman published their findings that the oval-to-head area of the serpent is aligned to the summer solstice sunset. The coiled tail of the mound is aligned to the winter solstice sunrise. The three curves of the serpent possibly have alignments to the summer solstice sunrise, equinox, and winter solstice sunrise, or alternatively align with important moonrises in the lunar cycle. However, the lines of sight are too short and vague to determine the actual alignment.

== Preservation ==
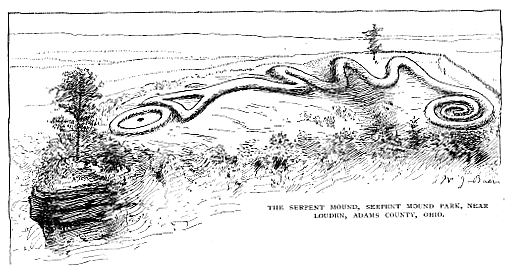
A depiction of the Serpent Mound that appeared in The Century periodical in April 1890, drawn by William Jacob Baer

Frederic Ward Putnam of the Peabody Museum of Archaeology and Ethnology at Harvard University spent much of his career lecturing and publishing on the Ohio mounds, specifically the Serpent Mound. When he visited the Midwest in 1885, he found that plowing and development were destroying many of the mounds. In 1886, with help from a group of wealthy women in Boston headed by Alice C. Fletcher, Putnam raised funds to purchase 60 acres (0.24 km^{2}) at the site of the Serpent Mound in hopes to ensure its preservation. Along with the Serpent Mound, the purchase also contained three conical mounds, a village site, and a burial place.

In 1900, the land and its ownership were granted to the Ohio State Archaeological and Historical Society (a predecessor of the present Ohio History Connection). The Ohio Historical Society designated the Arc of Appalachia Preserves system, a project of Highlands Sanctuary, Inc. as the managing agency of Serpent Mound from 2009 until 2021. The site is now managed by the Ohio History Connection. In 1966, Serpent Mound was added as a National Historic Landmark to the National Register of Historic Places. In 2008, the United States Department of State submitted Serpent Mound to the list of tentative UNESCO World Heritage Sites.

In 2012, a group that identified themselves as "light warriors" vandalized the Serpent Mound by running and jumping on its surface, as well as burying quartz in and around the mound to "reactivate" it. After a local drove his truck over one of the Adena burial mounds in 2015, more security cameras were installed at the site. Logan County prosecutor Ken Armstrong considered assigning the vandal a research paper on the site's history as punishment.

=== Excavation and survey ===
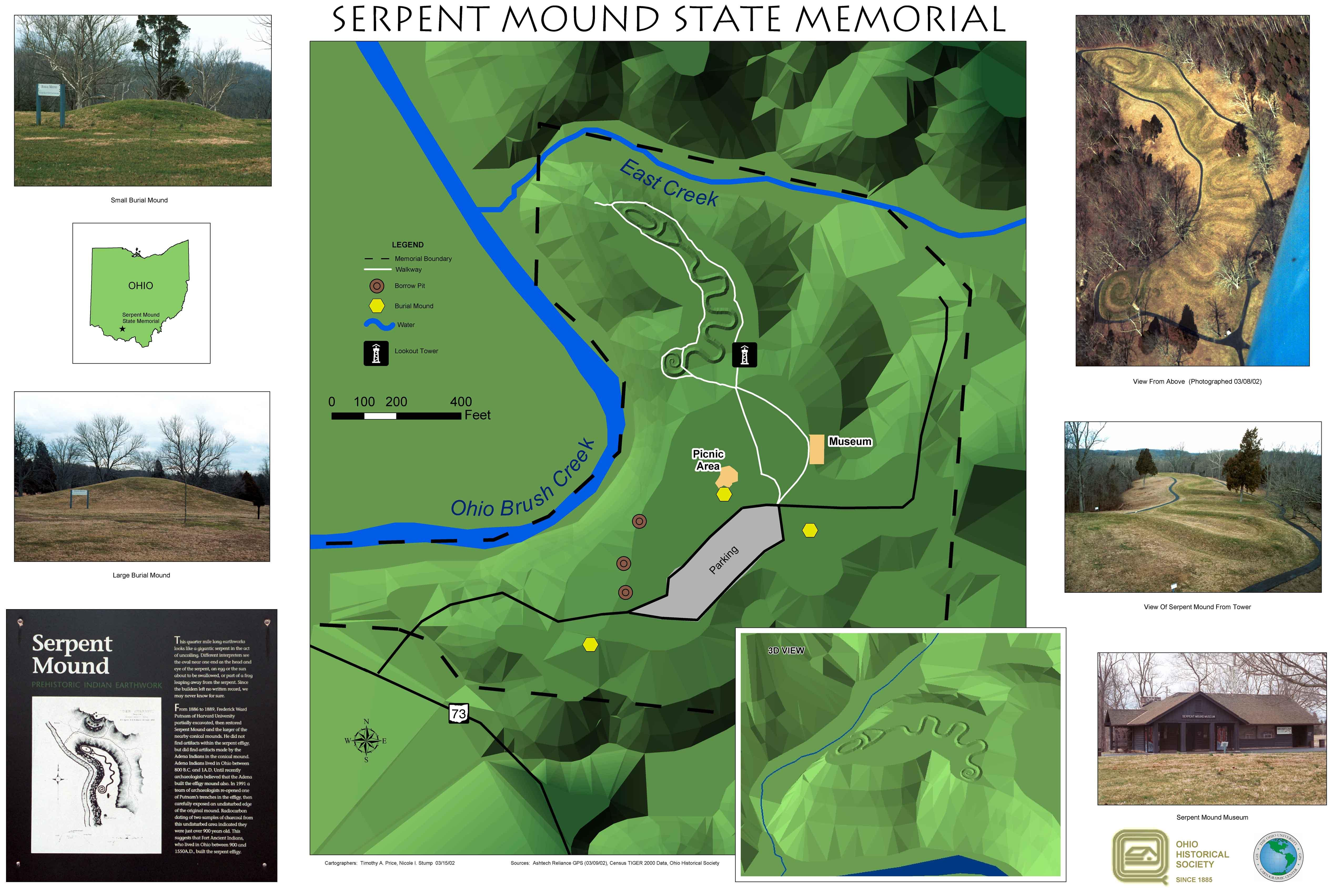
Digital Geographic Information System Map of the Serpent Mound

Squier and Davis were the first to publish a survey of Serpent Mound in 1848. In 1901, Clinton Cowen surveyed and mapped Serpent Mound and the area around it.

After raising funds to purchase the site, Frederic Ward Putnam returned to Serpent Mound in 1886. He worked for four years to excavate the burial sequence contents of both the Serpent Mound and two nearby conical mounds. After completing his excavation and publishing his work, Putnam worked on restoring the mounds to their original state. One of the conical mounds that was excavated by Putnam in 1890 yielded several artifacts of a principal burial during the period of the Adena people. Along with these findings, Putnam found and excavated nine intrusive burials in the mound through his discovery of an ash bed containing many prehistoric artifacts, north of the conical mound. After the excavation, the conical mound was reconstructed and currently stands just north of the parking lot at the Serpent Mound State Memorial.

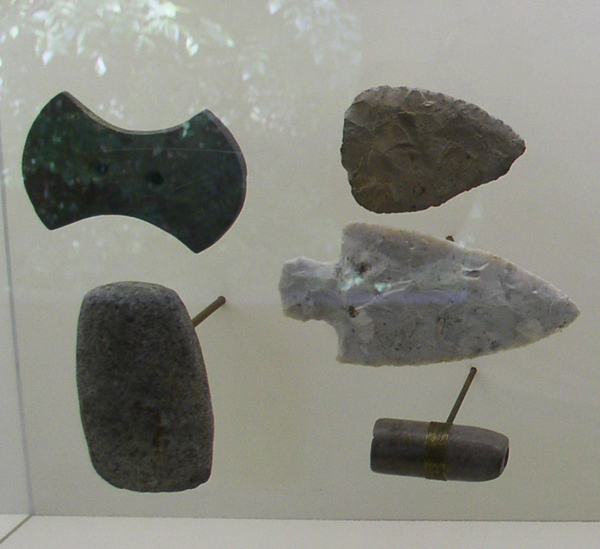
Gorgets and points from the Adena culture, found at the Serpent Mound

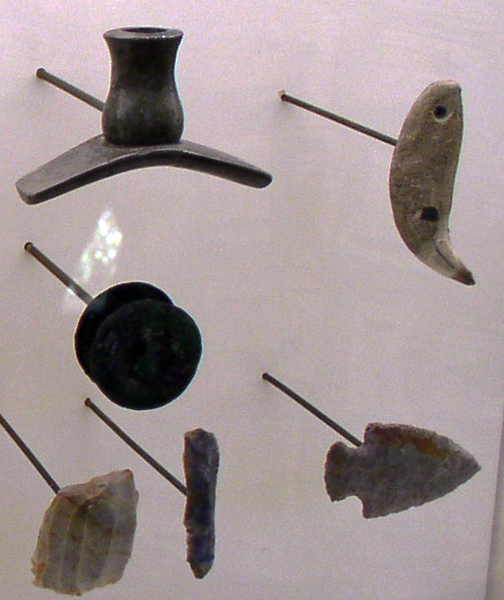
Hopewell pipe, points, and earspool on display at the Serpent Mound

During excavation of the Serpent Mound, archaeologists uncovered pipes, points, and earspools from the Hopewell culture as well as gorgets and points from the Adena culture.

In 2011, archaeologists took the opportunity to excavate the property prior to the installation of utility lines at the Serpent Mound State Memorial. The excavations focused on three sides of the conical mound that had been excavated previously by Putnam in 1890. In addition to these concentrations of artifacts, an ashy soil horizon was excavated north of the conical mound, where archaeologists were able to uncover many prehistoric artifacts. It is believed that the ashy deposit of charcoal is the remainder of a Fort Ancient Culture ash bed. The wood charcoal from within the remnant bed was carbon-dated back to the time of the Fort Ancient Culture, between the years of 1041 and 1211 CE. Given the results found through carbon dating, burials in the conical mound dated to the Early Woodland and Fort Ancient periods, suggestive of ritual reuse of the circum mound area and ash bed.

=== Serpent Mound Museum ===
In 1900, the site was given to the Ohio History Society, now known as the Ohio History Connection. The society built an observation tower overlooking the mound. A museum was opened in the mid 1970s. In 2009, the Arc of Appalachia Preserve System began managing the park for the Ohio History Connection, until the Ohio History Connection took over once more in early 2021.

== See also ==
- Newark Earthworks
- Hopewell Culture National Historical Park
- Cahokia
- Crooks Mound
- Glades culture
- Mound Builders
- Nazca Lines
- Spiro Mounds
