= Serpent Mound crater =

Eroded meteorite impact crater in Ohio, United States

Coordinates: 39°2′N 83°24′W

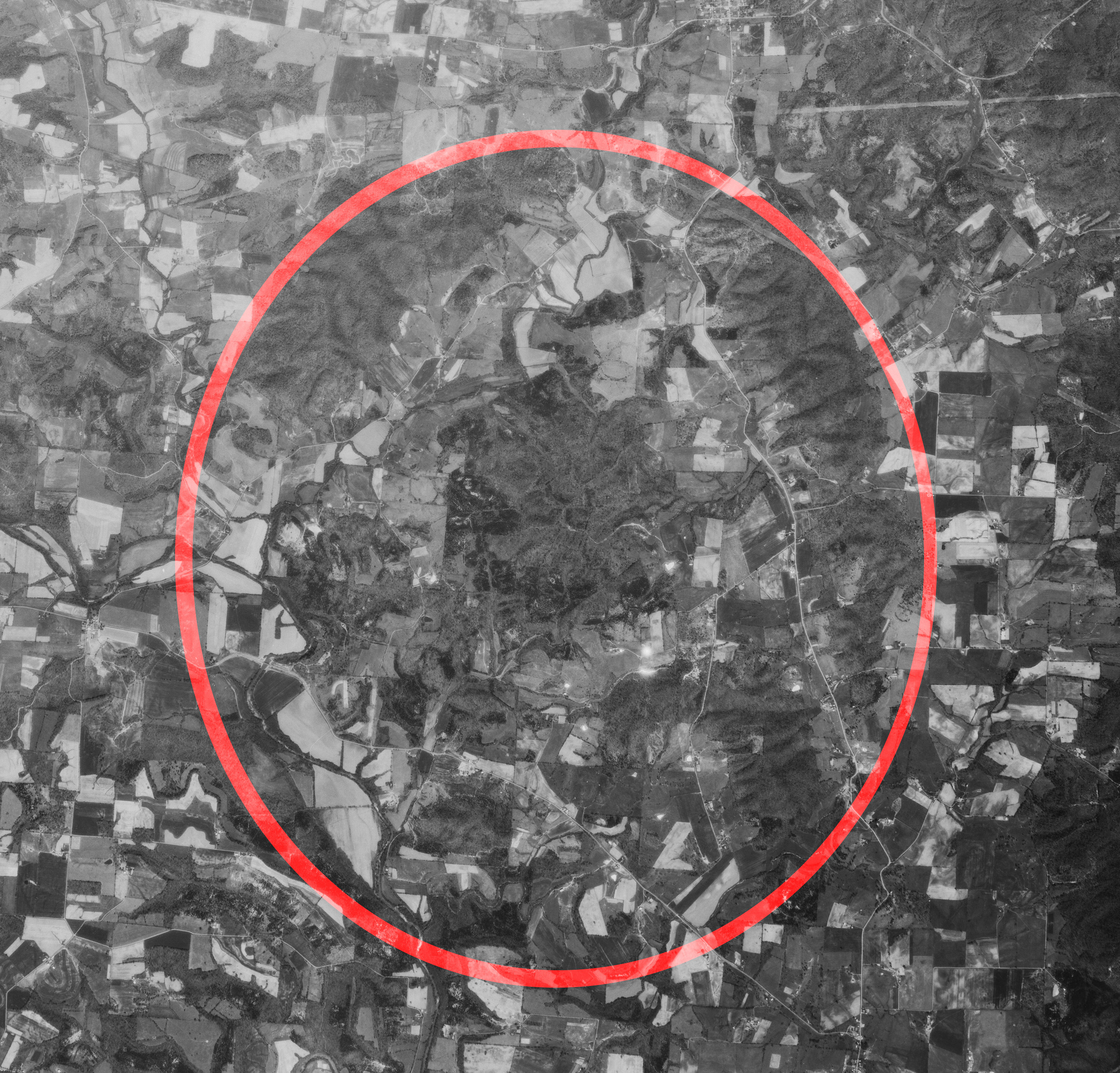
- Air photo showing the perimeter of Serpent Mound crater, in 1974

Impact crater structure
- Confidence: Confirmed
- Diameter: 8 kilometres (5.0 mi)
- Age: < 320 Ma
- Exposed: Yes
- Drilled: Yes

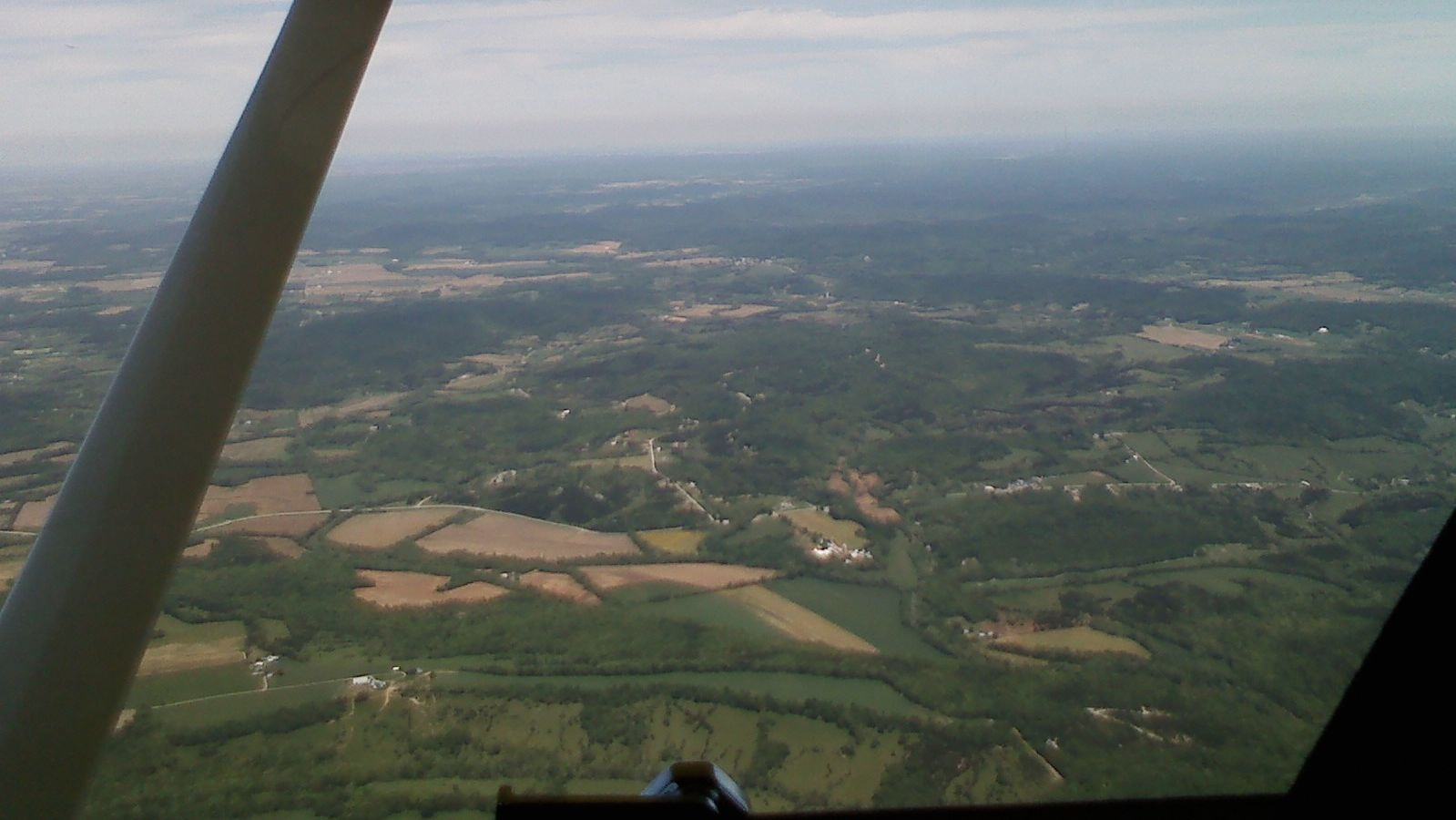
Oblique air photo of central Serpent Mound crater

Serpent Mound crater, also known as the Serpent Mound Disturbance, is an eroded meteorite impact crater in Ohio, United States. It lies largely in Adams County, with the northern part mostly in Highland County, except for a small northeast part in Pike County.

It is classified as a complex crater because it features a central uplift, a transition zone, and a ring graben (a ring-shaped trough in the outer part of the crater). Although eroded, the original rim diameter has been estimated at 8 km (5.0 mi) and the age is estimated to be less than 320 million years (Mississippian or younger). However, a 2010 paper suggested that the maximum rim diameter is 14 kilometres (8.7 mi).

The crater is named after the Serpent Mound, an effigy mound, located on a plateau in Brush Creek Valley within the crater. European-American explorers had already noted the unusual terrain in the 19th century, and it is often speculated that the odd geological features inspired Native Americans to construct the mound at that location.

In 1980, the Serpent Mound Cryptoexplosive Structure was designated as a National Natural Landmark by the National Park Service.
