= Highlands Sanctuary =

Nonprofit environmental stewardship organization

Highlands Sanctuary, Inc., is a nonprofit organization, doing business as The Arc of Appalachia Preserve System. The Arc of Appalachia has been in operation since 1995, working to create and steward nature preserves in the forested Appalachian counties of southern Ohio. In 2016, The Arc of Appalachia had completed the protection of 4268 acres in 15 preserve regions.

The Arc of Appalachia's mission is to protect the rich diversity of life of America's Great Eastern Temperate Forest, as the large biome expresses itself in the southern Ohio region. The Arc of Appalachia's land stewardship practices are guided by the following goals: to maximize the numbers of plants and animals native to the protected ecosystems, restore balance to the natural communities, and preserve natural beauty for visitors to enjoy on public hiking trails. The Arc of Appalachia is also an educational organization, offering to the public guided hikes, workshops, nature retreats, and nature literacy courses. The organization is funded primarily by private donations. The Arc of Appalachia's land acquisition is further enhanced through grant funding, especially through the Clean Ohio grant program.

The oldest preserve in the Arc of Appalachia's preserve system is the Highlands Nature Sanctuary in Highland County, Ohio, and Ross County, Ohio. The Highlands Nature Sanctuary is 2200 acres in size and exists to protect the Rocky Fork Gorge, defined as lower ten mile run of the Rocky Fork Creek, beginning at the creek's exit at the Rocky Fork State Park dam, and ending with the creek's confluence with Paint Creek just downstream of the Paint Creek Reservoir dam. The lower Rocky Fork cuts through a dolomite gorge which presents a classic karst landscape of grottos, vertical rock walls and canyons, sinkholes, seeps and springs.

Rocky Fork Gorge in the Highlands Nature Sanctuary, Highland County, Ohio, 2025

Among its visitor services, The Highlands Nature Sanctuary provides hiking trails to the public on weekends from spring through fall at the Appalachian Forest Museum, its main visitor hub.

In addition to its own preserves, the Arc of Appalachia is in contract with the Ohio History Connection to manage two Ohio state memorials, Serpent Mound and Fort Hill. . Fort Hill is a 1300-acre preserve protecting one of the oldest and largest mature forests in the state. It also preserves a large ridgetop walled-enclosure built by the American Indian Hopewell Culture 2000 years ago, a culture responsible for impressively large ancient ceremonial complexes built primarily of earth in southern Ohio, Serpent Mound is an internationally renowned archaeological site which also protects an ancient American Indian earthworks, an accurately portrayed earthen serpent, resting on a flat ridgetop which overlooks Ohio Brush Creek in Adams County. Its winding massive sinews span 1348 feet.

Preserving ancient earthworks, especially those of the Hopewell Culture, surrounded by larger, natural areas is a secondary mission of the Arc of Appalachia. The Arc of Appalachia, with other non-profit partners, has purchased and saved Junction Earthworks and Spruce Hill Earthworks near Chillicothe, Ohio, and has expanded the land holdings in the Fort Hill region by 200 acres. The Arc of Appalachia is currently endeavoring to expand Junction Earthwork through the purchase of an adjacent 73-acre earthworks complex known as Steel Earthworks, working in conjunction with The Archaeological Conservancy. Another ongoing project is to raise funds for the protection of Glenford Fort Earthworks in Perry County, a stone ridgetop enclosure surrounded by 65 acres of Appalachian forest.

The Arc of Appalachia preserves provide refuge for dozens of state threatened and endangered plants and animals, and several state-imperiled natural communities. In addition to its forest and archaeological preserves, the Arc of Appalachia maintains several native prairies within its holdings.

The Arc of Appalachia has the following preserves open for public visitation: Highlands Nature Sanctuary, Fort Hill, Serpent Mound, Junction Earthworks, Rock Run, Ohio Hanging Rock, Kamama Prairie, Plum Run Prairie, Chaparral Prairie, Ohio River Bluffs, Gladys Riley Golden Star Lily Preserve, Samson/Obrist Woods, Spruce Hill Earthworks, Quiverheart Gorge, and Chalet Nivale, with additional preserve trail systems in the planning and development phase.

== Gallery ==
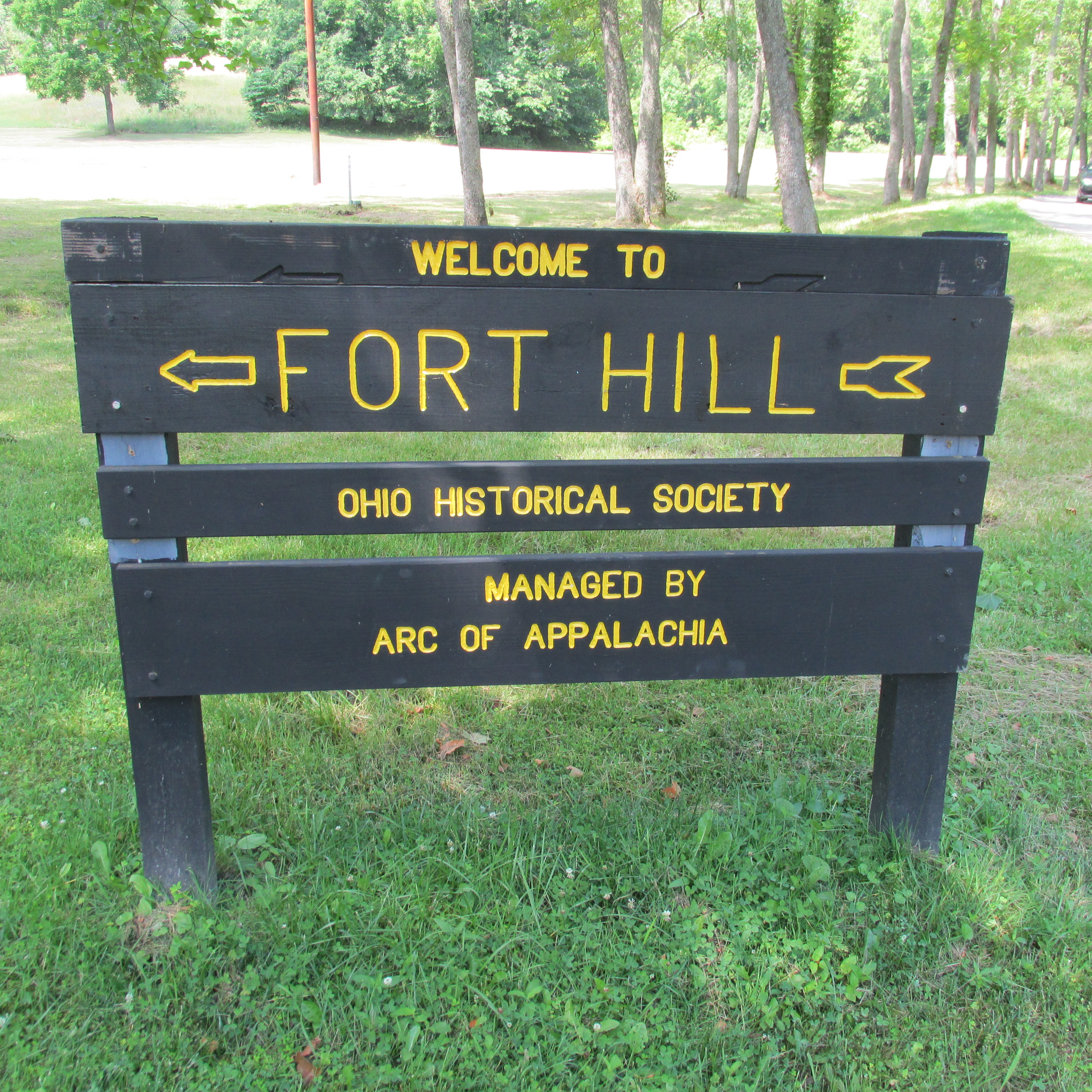
Entrance to Fort Hill.

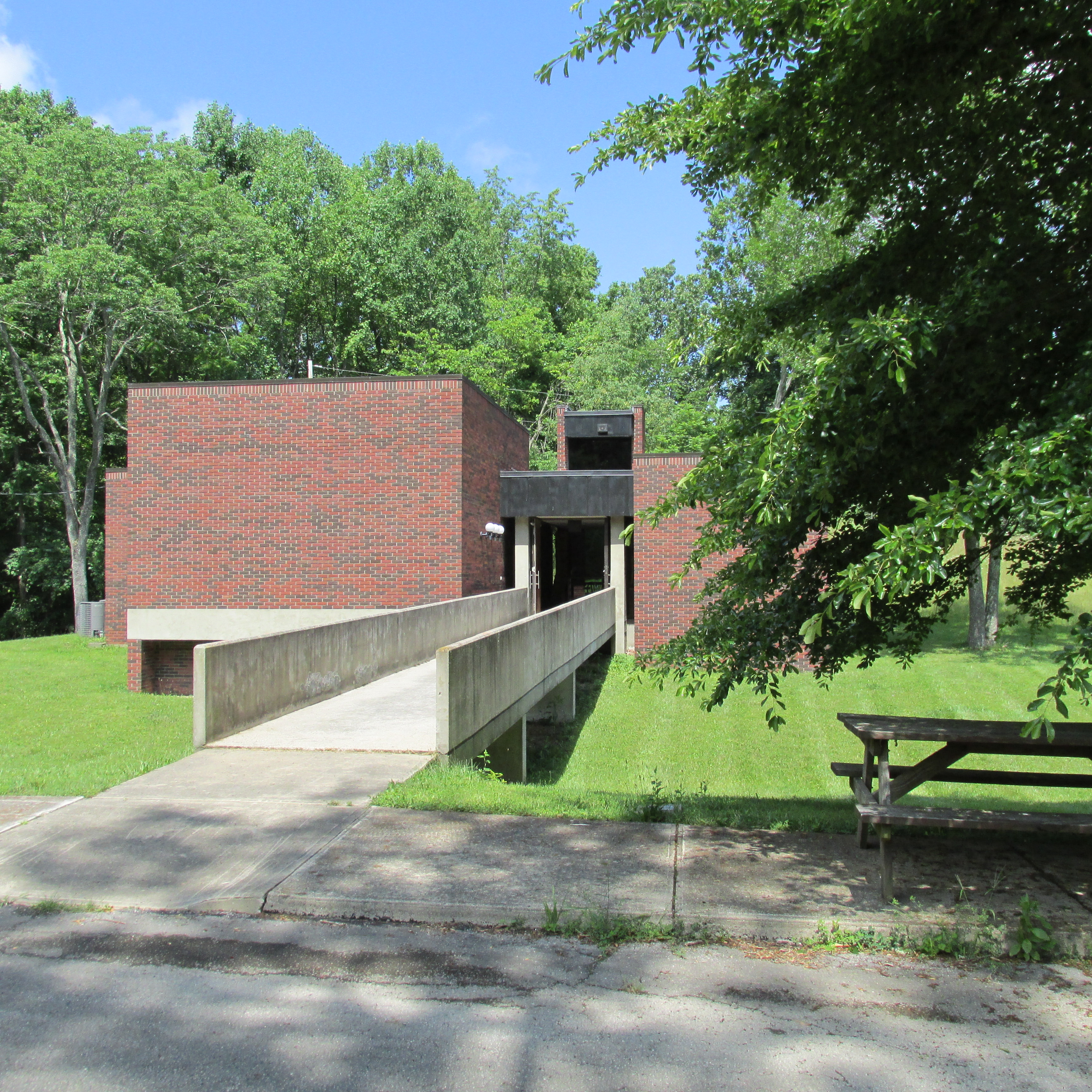
Fort Hill museum. Constructed in 1966.

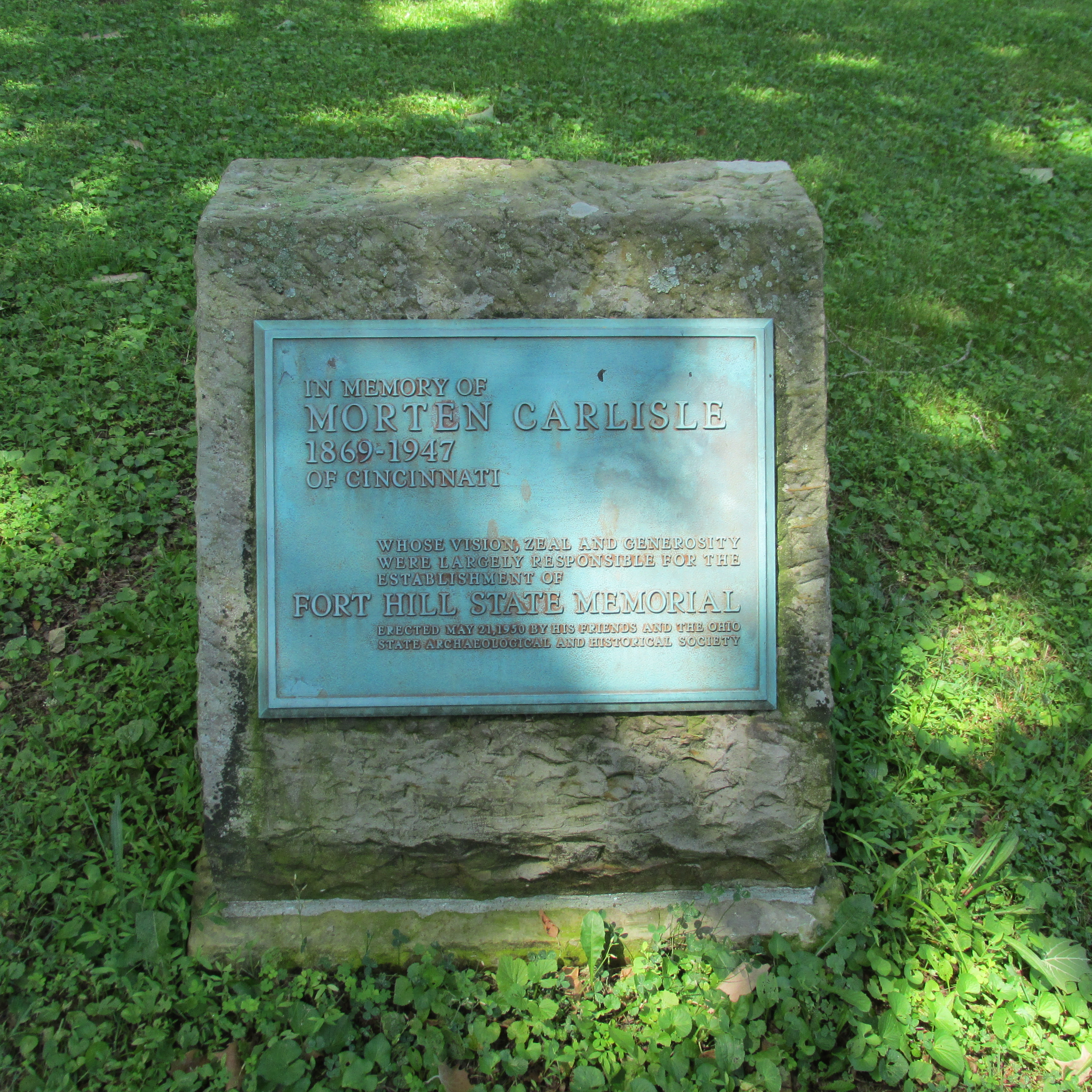
Monument to Morten Carlisle for his large responsibility for the establishment of Fort Hill State Memorial. Erected on May 21, 1950.

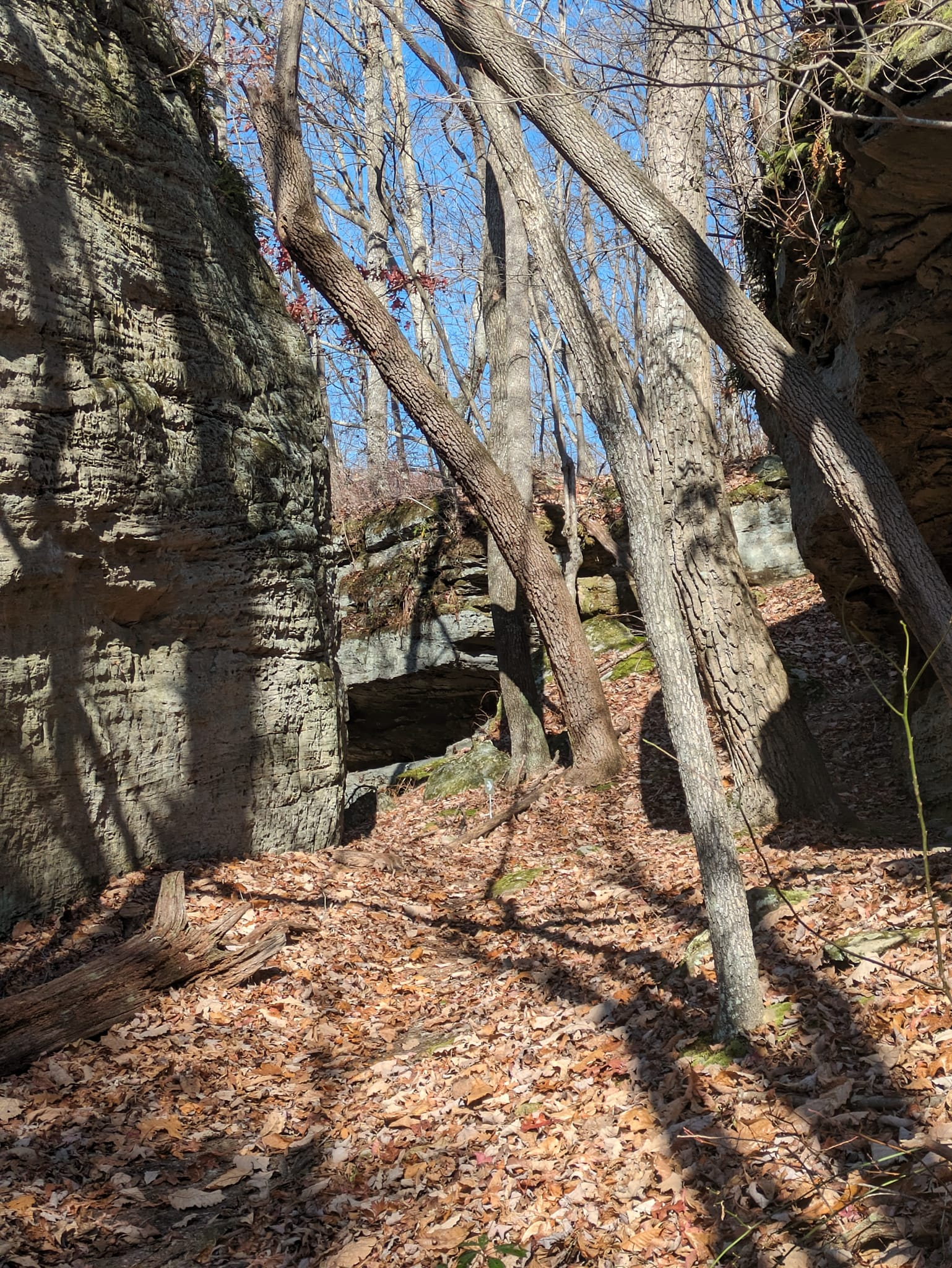
Rock Formations at Ohio Hanging Rock.

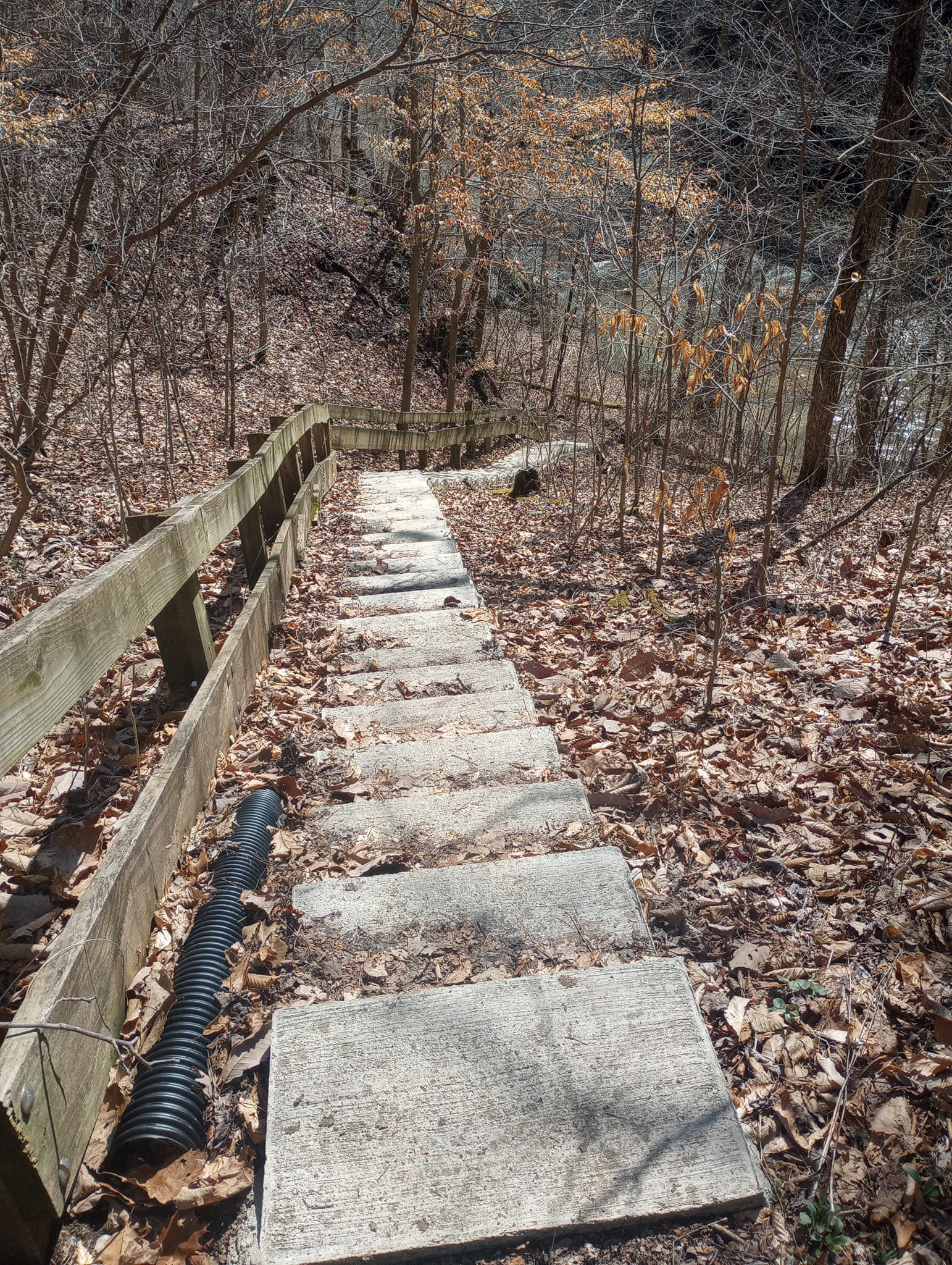
Stairs leading through the Gorge Trail at Fort Hill.

== Preserves ==
Preserves in the Arc of Appalachia system owned by Highlands Sanctuary

- Highlands Nature Sanctuary - 2,068 acres in Highland County, Ohio, features Appalachian Forest Museum
- Spruce Hill Earthworks (an ancient Native American fortification) - 270 acres in Ross County, Ohio
- Morgan's Fork - 147 acres in Pike County, Ohio
- Chalet Nivale - 105 acres in Adams County, Ohio
- Plum Run Prairie - 138 acres in Adams County, Ohio
- Kamama Prairie - 92 acres in Adams County, Ohio
- Hope Springs Woods - 108 acres in Adams County, Ohio
- Gladys Riley Golden Star - 53 acres in Scioto County, Ohio
- Rock Run - 355 acres in Adams County, Ohio
- Ohio River Bluffs - 62 acres in Adams County, Ohio
- Boone Nature Preserve - 35 acres in Brown County, Ohio
- Samson Woods - 78 acres in Pike County, Ohio
- Quiverheart Gorge - 99 acres in Adams County, Ohio
- Serpent Mound - 63 acres in Adams County, Ohio (owned by the Ohio Historical Society)
- Fort Hill State Memorial - 1,324 acres in Highland County, Ohio (owned by the Ohio Historical Society)
