= Ancient Monuments of the Mississippi Valley =

Book by Ephraim George Squier

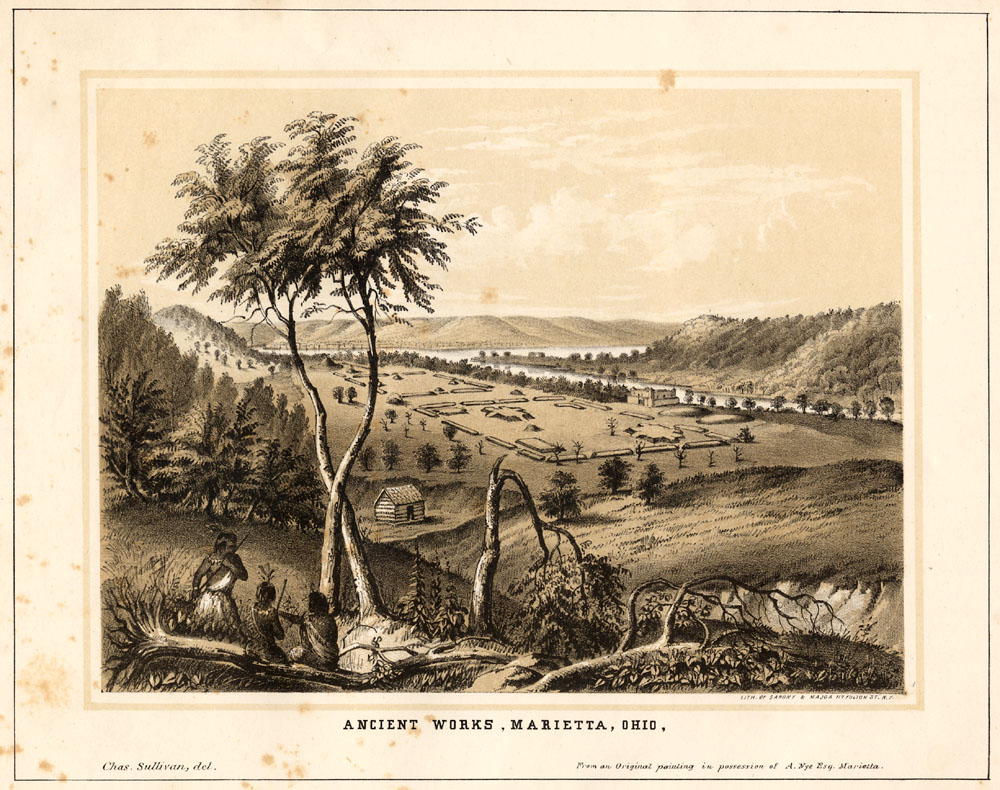
Library of Congress image used as the frontispiece for the 150th Anniversary re-issue of Squier and Davis' Ancient Monuments of the Mississippi Valley

Ancient Monuments of the Mississippi Valley (full title Ancient Monuments of the Mississippi Valley: Comprising the Results of Extensive Original Surveys and Explorations) (1848) by the Americans Ephraim George Squier and Edwin Hamilton Davis is a landmark in American scientific research, the study of the prehistoric indigenous mound builders of North America, and the early development of archaeology as a scientific discipline. Published in 1848, it was the Smithsonian Institution's first publication and the first volume in its Contributions to Knowledge series. The book had 306 pages, 48 lithographed maps and plates, and 207 wood engravings. The book was reissued in 1998 in paperback, with an introduction by David J. Meltzer, professor of anthropology at Southern Methodist University.

== Davis and Squier ==
Edwin Davis was born in 1811 in Hillsboro, Ohio, just a few miles from Chillicothe. As he grew up, he became familiar with the many mounds and earthworks of the Scioto River valley. Seeing these features as a young man inspired his deep curiosity about them. At the time, archaeology had not yet developed as an academic discipline. Davis explored the mounds while a student at Kenyon College and wrote a paper on the subject which he read at his commencement. Daniel Webster, an early member of the American Antiquarian Society, heard the paper and encouraged Davis to continue his research.

After graduating from medical college and establishing a practice in Chillicothe, Davis used his free time to continue his explorations. He collected artifacts he discovered in and around the mounds.

Ephraim Squier, ten years younger than Davis, was born in 1821 in Bethlehem, New York. By the time he arrived in Chillicothe in 1845 as the editor of the weekly Scioto Gazette newspaper, he had received training in civil engineering, education, and journalism. Squier was intrigued by the numerous prehistoric monuments in the surrounding area. His questioning of local residents about them failed to provide much insight. With his characteristic ambition, Squier decided to "take the compass and chain in one hand and the mattock and spade in the other" and begin his own research.

When the two men encountered one another, they began to collaborate based on Davis's knowledge of the Scioto Valley sites and growing collection of artifacts, combined with Squier's knowledge of surveying and writing. They combined their joint personal interests into a formal project for the Smithsonian Institution.

== Project scope ==
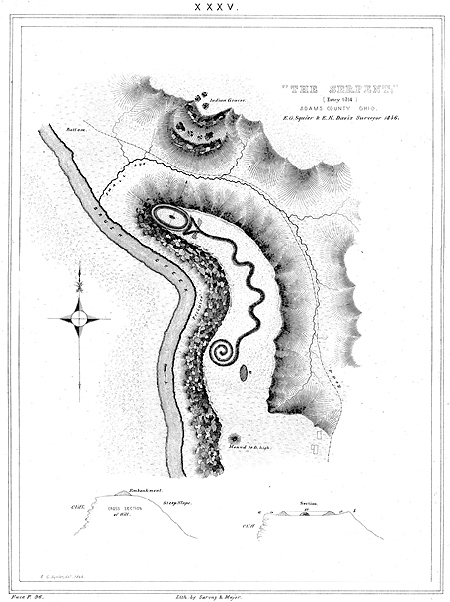
This map of Serpent Mound is one of many in Ancient Monuments surveyed and sketched by Squier and Davis.

Ancient Monuments provides descriptions of sites across much of the Eastern United States, as the title indicates. The hundreds of earthworks which Squier and Davis personally surveyed and sketched were located primarily in and around Ross County in southern Ohio. Ross County includes Mound City and Seip Earthworks (both now part of Hopewell Culture National Historical Park), as well as Dunlap Works. They also personally explored the nearby Serpent Mound, Fort Ancient, and Newark Earthworks.

The material for all their Kentucky sites was taken from the manuscripts of the late C. S. Rafinesque. James McBride, John Locke, and Charles Whittlesey, among others, contributed additional first-hand reports, but the scope of Squier and Davis's own work was unprecedented.

A major part of Squier and Davis's achievement was their classification of sites according to apparent function, such as burial grounds, effigies, fortifications, and building foundations. They sometimes were limited by their preconceptions about the cultures which they described. Their observation and descriptive skills often exceeded the quality of the records they made regarding excavation methods and recovery techniques related to artifacts.

== Contributions to knowledge ==
Ancient Monuments was edited by the physicist Joseph Henry, the first Secretary of the Smithsonian, who wanted a worthy initial volume for the Institution's Contributions to Knowledge series. Henry knew that the first book's reception would be important for both the Smithsonian and American science. His choosing a book devoted to the mound builders was risky, as their origin, history and identity were the subject of much debate and literature, but little scientific investigation. In addition, the subject touched on issues of race, religion, and the still raw tensions between Native Americans and ethnic European settlers.

Knowing that both anthropology and archaeology were relatively new fields of study, Henry sought to minimize Squier and Davis's speculation about the origins and purposes of the works they had surveyed and sketched. He emphasized the scientific presentation of their findings. The work clearly communicates the view—commonly held at the time—that the earthworks had been created by a race separate from and superior to contemporary Native American populations. This was based on the assessment that the mounds demonstrated a complexity of design and construction that did not seem related to what the European Americans had seen in contemporary Native American cultures, especially as these had been disrupted by widespread epidemics and warfare.

When the book was published, Squier and Davis's work immediately became a milestone in a still-developing field. Established then as a primary source on the subject of the mound builders, it retains that position because of the breadth of its coverage.

== Re-issue ==
A 150th anniversary paperback edition of Ancient Monuments of the Mississippi Valley was published by the Smithsonian in 1998. The extensive introduction was written by David J. Meltzer, professor of anthropology at Southern Methodist University.
