= Edwin Hamilton Davis =

American archaeologist and physician (1811–1888)

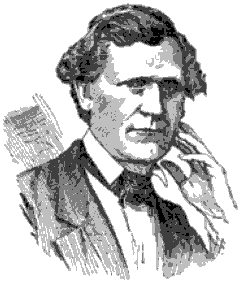
- Born: January 22, 1811; Hillsboro, Ohio
- Died: May 15, 1888 (aged 77); New York, New York
- Education: Cincinnati Medical College; New York Medical College
- Occupations: Archaeologist, physician
- Known for: Collection of mound relics
- Spouse: Lucy Woodbridge (m. 1841)
- Children: 9

Edwin Hamilton Davis (January 22, 1811 – May 15, 1888) was an American medical doctor and self taught archaeologist who completed pioneering investigations of the mound builders in the Mississippi Valley. Davis gathered what, at that time, was the largest privately held collection of prehistoric Indian artifacts in the United States.

== Early life ==
Edwin Hamilton Davis was born in Ross County, Ohio on January 22, 1811. He graduated at Cincinnati Medical College in 1838. He practised in Chillicothe, Ohio until 1850, when he was called to the chair of materia medica and therapeutics in the New York Medical College. Dr. Davis was one of the editors of the American Medical Monthly.

He married Lucy Woodbridge in 1841, and they had nine children.

== Archaeology ==
Davis gave much attention to the subject of American antiquities and aided Charles Whittlesey in explorations of ancient mounds in 1836. Then from 1845 until 1847, assisted by E. G. Squier, Davis surveyed nearly one hundred groups of aboriginal earthworks, and opened two hundred mounds at his own expense. Among Davis and Squier's most important achievements was their systematic approach to analyzing and documenting the sites they surveyed, including the Serpent Mound in Peebles, Ohio, which they discovered in 1846, and the mapping of the Mound City Group in Chillicothe, Ohio, which has been restored using their data and became part of Hopewell Culture National Historical Park.

In 1848, the results of Davis and Squier's explorations were embodied in the book Ancient Monuments of the Mississippi Valley, which formed the first volume of the Smithsonian contributions to knowledge series. The work was a landmark in American scientific research, the study of the prehistoric Mound Builders of North America, and the early development of archaeology as a scientific discipline. The work clearly communicates the view—commonly held at the time—that the earthworks had been created by a race separate from and superior to contemporary Native American populations. This was based on the assessment that the mounds demonstrated a complexity of design and construction that did not seem related to what the European Americans had seen in contemporary Native American cultures, especially as these had been disrupted by widespread epidemics and warfare. It was characterized by the distinguished Swiss archaeologist, Charles Adolphe Morlot, in a paper before the American Philosophical Society in 1862, as being "as glorious a monument of American science as Bunker Hill is of American bravery."

During the spring of 1854, Davis delivered a course of lectures on archaeology before the Lowell Institute in Boston, which were repeated in Brooklyn and New York City.

In 1858 he was elected a member of the American Antiquarian Society.

== Collections ==
Davis gathered the largest collection of mound relics in the United States, which originally formed part of the collection of the Blackmore Museum in Salisbury. It was later acquired by the British Museum in 1931 to form the greatest collection of ancient Native American artefacts outside the US. A second collection of duplicates, with the results of subsequent collecting, is in the possession of the American Museum of Natural History.

== Death ==
Davis died at his home in New York City on May 15, 1888. He was interred at the Grandview Cemetery, Chillicothe in Ross County, Ohio.
