= E. G. Squier =

American archaeologist and journalist (1821–1888)

Ephraim George Squier
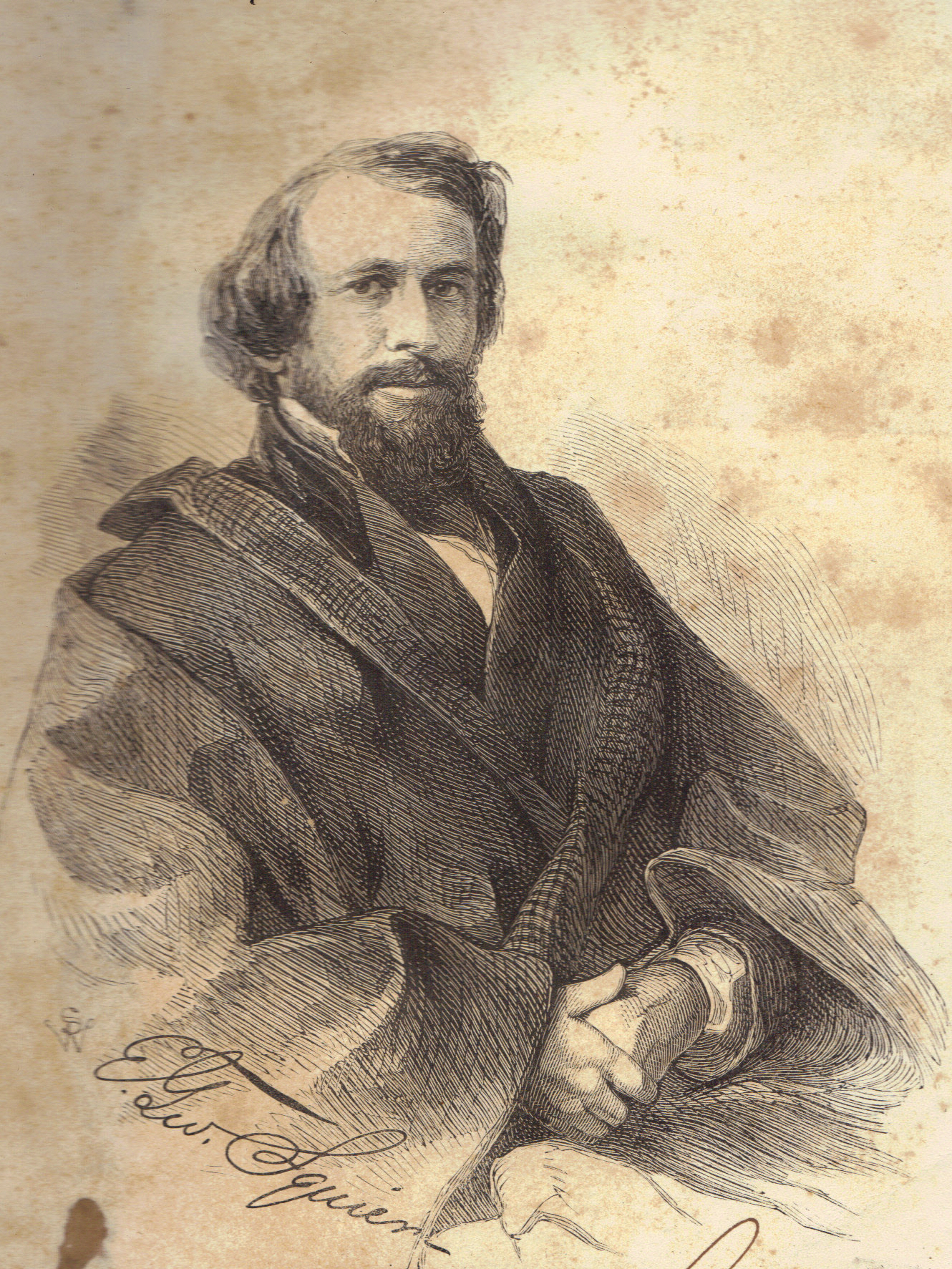
- Ephraim George Squier, c. 1870
- Born: June 17, 1821; Bethlehem, New York, U.S.
- Died: April 17, 1888 (aged 66); Brooklyn, New York, U.S.
- Citizenship: American
- Known for: Ancient Monuments of the Mississippi Valley
- Scientific career
- Fields: Archaeology

Ephraim George Squier (June 17, 1821 – April 17, 1888) was an American archaeologist, diplomat, and journalist. Born in Bethlehem, New York, he spent his early career in the northeastern United States. There, along with his colleague Edwin H. Davis, he was a prominent investigator of the prehistoric Indian mounds of the Ohio River valley. Squier received national recognition after he co-authored Ancient Monuments of the Mississippi Valley (1848). It was the first publication of the newly established Smithsonian Institution.

Squier's diplomatic career and archaeological fieldwork reflected his involvement in the geopolitical expansion of the United States. A proponent of American commercial interests, he also looked to Central America for interoceanic transit routes. Squier negotiated treaties in Nicaragua and Honduras, and his diplomatic efforts placed him in direct conflict with the British Empire. He began his professional practice as a newspaper editor and political organizer before developing his better-known career as an anthropologist and surveyor of Inca sites in Peru.

Later in his life, Squier's theoretical conclusions regarding a "lost race" of Mound Builders fell out of favor. Following a severe mental breakdown and the end of his marriage to Miriam Florence Folline, he moved out of his active professional life and into a private asylum, eventually living quietly in Brooklyn. Squier was a founding member and the first president of the Anthropological Institute of New-York. His empirical surveying methods established early standards for American archaeology, and his collections are held by institutions like the American Museum of Natural History and the Peabody Museum of Archaeology and Ethnology.

== Early life and journalism ==
Ephraim George Squier was born on June 17, 1821, in Bethlehem, New York. His father, Joel Squier, was an itinerant Methodist minister, and his mother, Katherine Kilmer Squier, died when he was twelve years old. Due to his family's modest means, Squier largely educated himself and attended local common schools. Between 1836 and 1839, he studied at the Troy Conference Academy in West Poultney, Vermont. He briefly worked as a teacher in local schools but disliked the profession. Squier studied mathematics and geometry to qualify as a civil engineer. He abandoned the field after the Panic of 1837 halted public works construction.

Squier subsequently pursued a career in literature and journalism. In 1840, he became a contributing editor for The Literary Pearl, a poetry magazine published in Charlton, New York. He relocated to Albany, New York, where he published the short-lived Lady's Cabinet Magazine and The Poet's Magazine. In Albany, Squier co-edited the New York State Mechanic with Joel Munsell. The weekly newspaper served as the official organ of the New York Mechanics' Association. Squier wrote editorials advocating for the social advancement of the working class and campaigned against the use of convict labor in mechanical trades.

The New York State Mechanic ceased publication in June 1843. In November of that year, Squier moved to Connecticut to co-edit the Hartford Journal. The newspaper was an official organ of the Whig Party, and Squier used his position to advocate for protective tariffs and support Henry Clay's 1844 presidential campaign. He also worked as a political organizer, establishing local Clay Clubs and serving as a delegate to the 1844 Whig Young Men's Convention. Following Clay's electoral defeat and the sale of the Hartford Journal, Squier accepted a position as the editor of the Scioto Gazette. He relocated to Chillicothe, Ohio, in early 1845.

== North American archaeology ==
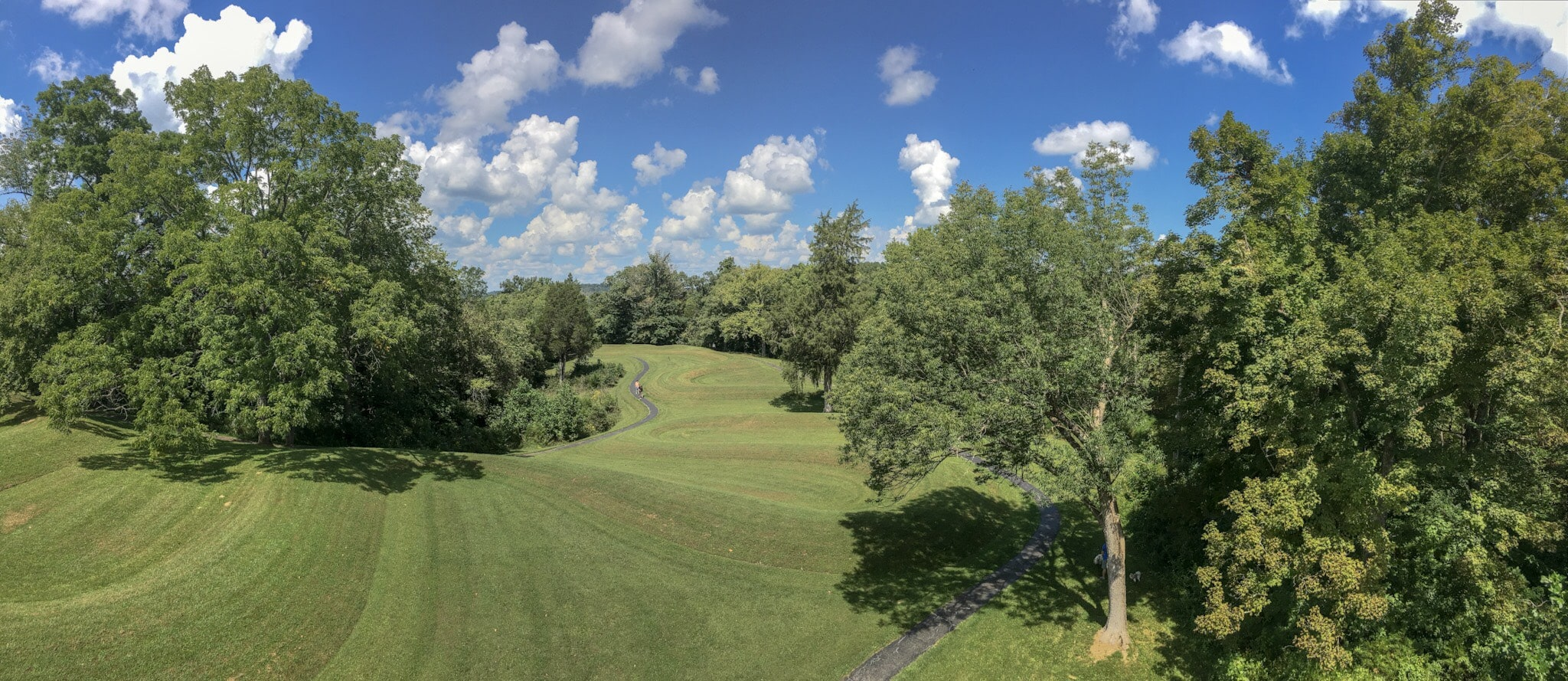
Squier and Davis's 1846 survey map of the Serpent Mound in Ohio, published in Ancient Monuments of the Mississippi Valley.

Squier moved to Chillicothe, Ohio, in 1845 to edit the Scioto Gazette. There, he met Edwin Hamilton Davis, a local physician who had investigated prehistoric Indian mounds since 1831. Squier and Davis formed a partnership to systematically survey and excavate the earthworks of the Scioto River valley. Between 1845 and 1847, they excavated approximately two hundred mounds and surveyed one hundred earthen enclosures. Davis financed the majority of the fieldwork and classified the recovered artifacts. Squier conducted the surveying, drafted the maps, and wrote the resulting reports. They recorded the internal stratigraphy of the mounds and distinguished between the original deposits at the base and the intrusive, later burials near the surface.

Squier sought financial backing from eastern scientific organizations, including the American Ethnological Society and the American Antiquarian Society. In 1847, Joseph Henry, the first secretary of the newly established Smithsonian Institution, agreed to publish their findings. Henry insisted that Squier and Davis remove their unsubstantiated speculations from the manuscript to ensure the work remained a strictly empirical, scientific addition to human knowledge. Ancient Monuments of the Mississippi Valley was published in 1848 as the inaugural volume of the Smithsonian Contributions to Knowledge series. During the publication process, Squier and Davis developed an acrimonious dispute over authorship and credit. Squier claimed primary responsibility for the research and marginalized Davis's contributions, leading to the permanent estrangement of the two men.

In Ancient Monuments, Squier and Davis classified the earthworks into functional categories, including defensive works, sacred enclosures, altar mounds, and sepulchral mounds. They concluded that the mounds were constructed by a dense, agricultural population possessing mathematical and engineering skills. Squier and Davis adhered to the 19th-century "Mound Builder" myth, arguing that the builders were an extinct, highly civilized race distinct from contemporary Native Americans. They submitted a skull recovered from an original mound burial to the physical anthropologist Samuel George Morton. Morton classified the cranium as "Toltecan." Squier hypothesized that the Mound Builders were ethnically linked to the indigenous civilizations of Mexico and Central America and had been driven southward by hostile hunter-gatherer tribes.

Despite their adherence to the Mound Builder myth, Squier and Davis rejected claims that the ancient inhabitants possessed alphabetic writing. Squier publicly denounced the Grave Creek Stone, an inscribed tablet allegedly found in a West Virginia mound, as a hoax. He argued that attributing alphabetic writing to the Mound Builders contradicted the historical development of indigenous American civilizations. In 1849, Squier conducted a separate survey of earthworks in western New York, published by the Smithsonian as Aboriginal Monuments of the State of New York. He concluded that the New York enclosures were relatively recent and had been constructed by the Iroquois for defensive purposes. He maintained that the larger Ohio earthworks were the product of the extinct Mound Builder race.

== Diplomatic career in Central America ==
Key locations of Squier's diplomatic and commercial efforts in Central America.

In May 1849, the Zachary Taylor administration appointed Squier as chargé d'affaires to Central America. The United States sought an interoceanic transit route following the California Gold Rush and the acquisition of Pacific territories to incorporate the Pacific basin market into the American economy. Squier's primary directive was to secure the right-of-way for a canal across Nicaragua. On August 27, 1849, he negotiated a treaty granting the American Atlantic and Pacific Ship-Canal Company, directed by Cornelius Vanderbilt, exclusive rights to construct the waterway. Squier aggressively opposed British territorial claims in the region and recommended the United States purchase Tigre Island in the Gulf of Fonseca. British forces seized the island in October 1849. The United States Senate declined to ratify Squier's treaty to avoid a direct confrontation with Great Britain. The diplomatic tensions generated by Squier's negotiations were subsequently resolved by the Clayton–Bulwer Treaty of 1850.

Squier shifted his focus to Honduras in 1852 after the Nicaraguan canal project stalled. He proposed a 160-mile railway from Puerto Caballos on the Caribbean to the Gulf of Fonseca on the Pacific. Squier formed a preliminary company with New York merchants and politicians, including Robert J. Walker and Robert F. Stockton. In February 1853, he led a surveying expedition to Honduras under the guise of a scientific mission. Squier negotiated a charter with Honduran President José Trinidad Cabañas on June 23, 1853. The agreement granted the company exclusive transit rights, free construction materials, and 1,000 square miles of land.

Squier intervened in Central American politics to protect the railway concession. Cabañas's Liberal government faced an impending military invasion from Guatemalan Conservative forces led by Rafael Carrera. Squier arranged a $20,000 loan for the Honduran government to purchase cannons, rifles, and ammunition in the United States. He also attempted to manipulate diplomatic relations between Honduras and the United States to secure a treaty guaranteeing the railway route. Squier financed the travel of Honduran minister José Francisco Barrundia to Washington, D.C., but Barrundia died in August 1854 before negotiations commenced.

Unable to raise sufficient capital in the United States, Squier traveled to Europe in 1855 to solicit French and British investors. British capitalists, including member of Parliament William Brown, expressed interest but refused to invest while territorial disputes between Great Britain and Honduras remained unresolved. Squier acted as an intermediary to settle the diplomatic conflict. He influenced the Dallas-Clarendon convention of 1856 and helped negotiate an 1856 treaty between Honduras and Great Britain. The agreements provided for the British relinquishment of the Mosquito Coast protectorate and the return of the Bay Islands to Honduras, with a clause guaranteeing the neutrality of the proposed railway.

The British investors organized the Honduras Interoceanic Railway Company, Limited, in January 1857 and purchased Squier's charter for $120,000. Squier returned to New York to manage the company's American agency and dispatched a second surveying expedition led by chief engineer John C. Trautwine. Trautwine's final report in 1858 concluded that the railway would require 231 miles of track, multiple tunnels, and $14 million to construct, more than double Squier's original estimates. The revised costs and noncommittal reports from British inspectors discouraged the investors. The company abandoned the project in September 1859.

== South American expeditions ==
In 1863, President Abraham Lincoln appointed Squier as a United States claims commissioner to Peru to resolve commercial disputes over guano mining. Squier arrived in Callao on July 3, 1863, aboard the steamer Valparaiso with his fellow commissioner James S. Mackie. Squier completed his diplomatic duties during the first six months of his appointment. He spent the following eighteen months surveying and photographing archaeological sites across Peru and Bolivia.

Squier explored coastal ruins from Tumbes to Cobija, including Pachacamac, Grand Chimú, and Cajamarquilla. He then traveled inland across the Andes to the site of Tiahuanaco in Bolivia. Squier and the Italian-born scientist Antonio Raimondi spent three weeks navigating Lake Titicaca to document its islands and chullpas (stone burial towers). Squier continued to Cusco, where he surveyed the Sacsahuaman fortress and the citadel at Ollantaytambo. During his fieldwork, Squier condemned the widespread practice of treasure hunting, criticizing individuals like Colonel La Rosa for systematically destroying Chimú and Inca architecture in search of hidden gold and silver.

Squier used the wet collodion photographic process to record the monuments. On the coast, he collaborated with the photographer Augustus Le Plongeon, who took stereoscopic images of sites like Cajamarquilla and Chan Chan. Le Plongeon later accused Squier of publishing his photographs without credit or compensation, while Squier maintained that he owned the photographic equipment and the resulting negatives. For his highland expedition, Squier claimed his photographer died at Lake Aullages and that he taught himself the photographic process using a chemistry manual to complete the documentation.

Squier collected pottery, metalwork, and human remains during his travels. He donated seventy-five Peruvian crania to the Peabody Museum of Archaeology and Ethnology at Harvard University. The museum's curator, Jeffries Wyman, measured the skulls and documented the practice of artificial cranial deformation among the Aymara and other indigenous groups. In the valley of Yucay, Squier acquired an Inca skull exhibiting a rectangular hole cut into the frontal bone. He presented the skull to the French anthropologist Paul Broca, who presented it to the Anthropological Society of Paris in 1867 as the first evidence of pre-Columbian trepanning and advanced aboriginal surgery.

Squier published the results of his South American research in the 1877 book Peru: Incidents of Travel and Exploration in the Land of the Incas. The publication included 259 wood engravings. Many of the engravings were derived directly from the expedition's stereoscopic photographs. Commercial illustrators and engravers, including Benjamin H. Day Jr. and De Witt Clinton Hitchcock, translated the photographs into wooden printing blocks. To compensate for the limitations of the medium, the engravers occasionally altered the original compositions by adding scale figures, modifying backgrounds, and reinterpreting damaged architectural features.

== Later life, mental collapse, and death ==
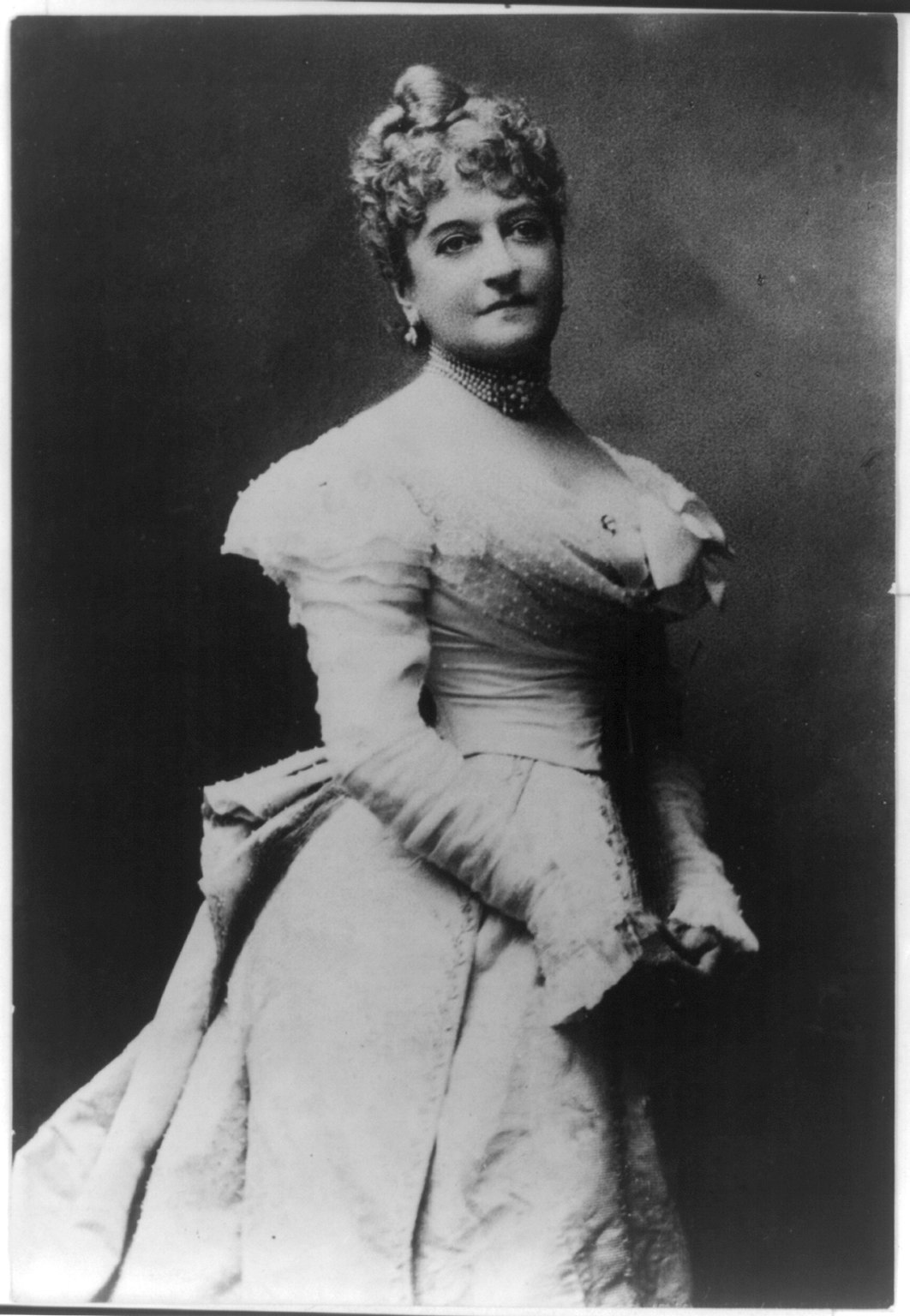
Miriam Florence Folline, whose highly publicized affair with publisher Frank Leslie and subsequent divorce from Squier precipitated his mental collapse.

In September 1861, Squier became the managing editor of Frank Leslie's Illustrated Newspaper. The publisher, Frank Leslie, had rented rooms in the Squiers' East Thirty-ninth Street home in New York City the previous year. Squier edited the newspaper until his departure for Peru in 1863, and he resumed his editorial duties upon his return in 1865. The Squiers' marriage deteriorated during this period. In February 1867, Squier, Miriam, and Leslie traveled together to the Paris Exposition. Upon arriving in Liverpool, Squier was arrested for an outstanding debt related to the Honduras Interoceanic Railway and spent ten days in a debtor's prison at Lancaster Castle. Squier suspected that Leslie or Miriam had sent a telegram tipping off his creditor to remove him from the group. Squier continued to work for Leslie until 1873, but he ceased editing the Illustrated Newspaper after 1868.

On April 25, 1873, Squier received a summons for divorce from Miriam. She accused him of committing adultery with several women, including Lizzie A. Rice, "Gypsy", and "Indiana", at assignation houses in New York City. During a special term of the Superior Court of New York, artists Matt Morgan and De Witt Clinton Hitchcock testified that Squier had invited them to a brothel, where he admitted to sleeping with the women. Squier did not appear in court or contest the charges, and the divorce was granted on May 31, 1873. In private correspondence, Squier claimed he did not contest the divorce out of regard for Miriam's reputation, but warned he would expose her past if provoked.

Miriam married Frank Leslie on July 13, 1874. Squier experienced a severe mental breakdown the following day. His brother, Frank Squier, petitioned the New York City Court to establish a commission to inquire into his sanity. Squier's personal physician, Dr. A. A. Smith, and Dr. Meredith Clymer, president of the Neurological Society of New York, testified that Squier was delusional, incoherent, and incapable of managing his affairs. On August 18, 1874, Justice Charles Donohue declared Squier a "lunatic, not having lucid intervals" and entrusted his care to his brother and father. Squier was committed to the Sanford Hall Asylum in Flushing, Long Island.

Squier partially recovered by late 1874 and moved into his brother Frank's home in Brooklyn. His career as an active anthropologist ended with his breakdown. He sold his archaeological collection to the American Museum of Natural History in 1874, and his library of over 2,000 books, manuscripts, and photographs was sold at public auction by Bangs, Merwin, and Company in April 1876. With his brother's assistance, Squier completed and published his final major work, Peru: Incidents of Travel and Exploration in the Land of the Incas, in 1877. In 1878, Squier supplied Rollin M. Daggett, editor of the Daily Territorial Enterprise in Virginia City, Nevada, with court transcripts and intimate details of Miriam's early life. Daggett published the information on July 14, 1878, as an exposé targeting Miriam. Squier spent his final decade living quietly in Brooklyn, where he died on April 17, 1888.

== Legacy ==
Squier's publications helped establish early empirical standards for American archaeology. Ancient Monuments of the Mississippi Valley was the first major scientific publication to rely on the systematic surveying, mapping, and classification of prehistoric sites. Because agricultural and urban development destroyed many North American earthworks in the nineteenth and twentieth centuries, Squier and Davis's surveys are often the only surviving records of these locations. Modern archaeologists continue to use their maps and measurements to study altered or destroyed sites.

Later in the nineteenth century, Squier's theoretical conclusions fell out of favor. In the 1880s and 1890s, the Bureau of American Ethnology, under the direction of Cyrus Thomas, disproved Squier's theory that the Mound Builders were an extinct, highly civilized race separate from historic Native Americans. Squier's anthropological work was heavily influenced by the American School of Ethnology, a group of scientists including Samuel George Morton and Josiah Clark Nott who promoted polygenism and racial determinism. Squier utilized these racial theories to justify United States expansionism, commercial intervention, and white colonization in Central America.

Squier contributed to the institutional development of American anthropology. In 1871, he led the reorganization of the American Ethnological Society into the Anthropological Institute of New-York. He served as the institute's first president and attempted to align American anthropological practices with the more secular, science-based ethnological societies of Europe. His archaeological collections from Ohio, Central America, and Peru are held by the American Museum of Natural History in New York and the Peabody Museum of Archaeology and Ethnology at Harvard University.

=== Selected works ===
- Ancient Monuments of the Mississippi Valley (1848; co-authored with Edwin H. Davis)
- Aboriginal Monuments of the State of New-York (1851)
- The Serpent Symbol, and the Worship of the Reciprocal Principles of Nature in America (1851)
- Nicaragua: Its People, Scenery, Monuments, and the Proposed Interoceanic Canal (1852)
- Notes on Central America: Particularly the States of Honduras and San Salvador (1855)
- Waikna; or, Adventures on the Mosquito Shore (1855; published under the pseudonym Samuel A. Bard)
- The States of Central America (1858)
- Monograph of Authors Who Have Written on the Languages of Central America (1861)
- Tropical Fibres: Their Production and Economic Extraction (1861)
- Peru: Incidents of Travel and Exploration in the Land of the Incas (1877)

== Bibliography ==
- Barnhart, Terry A. (2005). Ephraim George Squier and the Development of American Anthropology. Lincoln, NE: University of Nebraska Press. ISBN 0-8032-1321-2.
- McElroy, Keith (1986). "Ephraim George Squier: Photography and the Illustration of Peruvian Antiquities". History of Photography. 10 (2): 99–129. doi:10.1080/03087298.1986.10443731.
- Schoonover, Thomas D. (1991). The United States in Central America, 1860–1911: Episodes of Social Imperialism and Imperial Rivalry in the World System. Durham, NC: Duke University Press. ISBN 978-0-8223-1160-7.
- Silverberg, Robert (1968). Mound Builders of Ancient America: The Archaeology of a Myth. Greenwich, CT: New York Graphic Society. OCLC 248221.
- Stansifer, Charles L. (1966). "E. George Squier and the Honduras Interoceanic Railroad Project". Hispanic American Historical Review. 46 (1): 1–27. doi:10.2307/2510598. JSTOR 2510598.
- Stern, Madeleine B. (1953). Purple Passage: The Life of Mrs. Frank Leslie. Norman, OK: University of Oklahoma Press. OCLC 1354032.
- Trigger, Bruce G. (2006). A History of Archaeological Thought (2nd ed.). New York: Cambridge University Press. ISBN 978-0-521-84076-7.
