= List of Hopewell sites =

This is a list of Hopewell sites. The Hopewell tradition (also called the "Hopewell culture") refers to the common aspects of the Native American culture that flourished along rivers in the northeastern and midwestern United States from 200 BCE to 500 CE. The Hopewell tradition was not a single culture or society, but a widely dispersed set of related populations that were connected by a common network of trade routes, known as the Hopewell Exchange System.

Site	Image	Description
Bynum Mound and Village Site	Bynum Mound and Village site	Located near Houston, Mississippi, the site is a complex of six conical shaped mounds which were built and in use during the Miller 1 and Miller 2 phases of the Miller culture (100 BCE to 100 CE). It was listed on the National Register of Historic Places in 1989 as a site on the Natchez Trace Parkway at milepost 232.4.
Cloverdale archaeological site		The Cloverdale archaeological site (23BN2) is an important site near St. Joseph, Missouri. It is located at the mouth of a small valley that opens into the Missouri River. It was occupied by Kansas City Hopewell peoples (ca. 100 to 500 CE). Secondly, it was occupied about 1000-1250 CE, by Steed-Kisker peoples. These originated were farming people of the Middle Mississippian culture believed to have migrated here from Cahokia. They gradually adapted to the Plains Village tradition and developed a culture with elements of both.
Crooks mound		A Marksville culture mound site, it is located in La Salle Parish, Louisiana. It is a large, conical, burial mound that was part of at least six episodes of burials. It measures about 16 ft high (4.9 m) and 85 ft wide (26 m).
Dunns Pond Mound	Dunns Pond Mound	The Dunns Pond Mound is a historic Native American mound in northeastern Logan County, Ohio. Located near Huntsville, it lies along the southeastern corner of Indian Lake in Washington Township. In 1974, the mound was listed on the National Register of Historic Places as a potential archeological site.
Everett Knoll Complex	Everett Mound	Located in Northeast Ohio within Cuyahoga Valley National Park. Several artifacts were found within a small mound with an unusual limestone crypt. Signs of habitation were discovered nearby.
Fortified Hill Works	Fortified Hill Works	Registered historic site near Hamilton, Ohio.
Fort Ancient	Fort Ancient (Lebanon, Ohio)	Fort Ancient is a collection of mounds and earthen walls located in Washington Township, Warren County, Ohio, along the eastern shore of the Little Miami River, about seven miles (11 km) southeast of present-day Lebanon and bordered by State Route 350. The site is the largest prehistoric hilltop enclosure in the United States, with three and one-half miles (18,000 ft or 5,500 m) of walls in a 100-acre (0.40 km^{2}) complex.
Grand Gulf Mound		An Early Marksville culture site located near Port Gibson in Claiborne County, Mississippi, on a bluff 1 mile (1.6 km) east of the Mississippi River, 2 miles (3.2 km) north of the mouth of the Big Black River. The site has an extant burial mound, and it may have had two others in the past.
Great Hopewell Road		A road constructed by two parallel walls, with its origin at the Newark Earthworks in Ohio. Traces of the road remain for several miles, in a nearly straight line, and archaeologists have hypothesized that the original road stretched from Newark to a site sixty miles away at Chillicothe. While further study is needed, this road could have been a pilgrimage route or a corridor for trade.
Hopeton Earthworks	Hopeton Earthworks	The Hopeton Earthworks are an Ohio Hopewell group of mounds and earthworks located about a mile east of the Mound City Group on a terrace of the Scioto River. Along with the Mound City Group, it is one of the sites which make up the Hopewell Culture National Historical Park.
Hopewell Culture National Historical Park	Mound City Group	Hopewell Culture National Historical Park, formerly known as Mound City Group National Monument, is a United States national historical park with earthworks and burial mounds from the Hopewell culture, indigenous peoples who flourished from about 200 BCE to 500 CE. The park is composed of six separate sites in Ross County, Ohio. The park includes archaeological resources of the Ohio Hopewell culture.
Hopewell Mound Group		The Hopewell Mound Group is the namesake and type site for the Hopewell culture and one of the six sites that make up the Hopewell Culture National Historical Park. The group of mounds and earthworks enclosures are located several miles to the west of the Chillicothe on the northern bank of Paint Creek.
Indian Mound Cemetery	Indian Mound Cemetery	Indian Mound Cemetery is a cemetery located with access to Northwestern Turnpike (U.S. Route 50) and on a bluff overlooking the South Branch Potomac River in Romney, West Virginia. The cemetery is centered around a Hopewell mound. The mound measures seven feet high and about fifteen feet in diameter. It is the largest of the remaining earthwork mounds discovered in West Virginia's Eastern Panhandle. The city of Romney has never allowed the mound to be excavated. The Smithsonian Institution suggests this mound might date between 500 and 1000 CE and that it was likely constructed by peoples of the Hopewell culture.
Junction Group		Earthworks site in Ross County, Ohio. Located near: 39.317045 -83.013619
Kolomoki Mounds Historic Park	Kolomoki Mounds Historic Park	The Kolomoki Mounds are Woodland Period mounds built in Early County, Georgia. The seven earthwork mounds at the site were built between 250 and 950 CE by peoples of the Swift Creek and Weeden Island cultures.
Lake Ridge Island Mounds	Lake Ridge Island Mounds	The Lake Ridge Island Mounds (also known as the Wolf Mounds I-IV) are a group of small hills in Logan County, Ohio, that have been thought to be Native American mounds. Located in an area of about 5 acres (2.0 ha) at the northern end on Lake Ridge Island in Indian Lake, the mounds are near the present-day village of Russells Point in the southeastern corner of Stokes Township.
Leake Mounds	Leake Mounds	Leake Mounds is an archaeological site in Bartow County, Georgia, built and used by peoples of the Swift Creek Culture.
Lewiston Mound	Lewiston Mound	A burial mound located at Lewiston, New York, in Niagara County, New York. The Earl W. Brydges Artpark State Park has been developed around it and preserves the mound.
Mann site	Mann site, looking west	The Mann site (12 Po 2) is located in Posey County, Indiana, near the confluence of the Wabash and Ohio rivers. Because of the scale and complexity of the earthworks, it is thought to have had a larger population than Hopewell sites in Ohio, and may be the largest site of this era in all the Midwest. It was placed on the National Historic Register in 1974.
Marietta Earthworks	Marietta Earthworks	Located at the confluence of the Muskingum and Ohio rivers in Washington County, Ohio, it has been covered by development of the modern-day city of Marietta. The site once consisted of at least four large platform mounds, three walled enclosures, and a large burial mound, now enclosed and preserved in the Mound Cemetery.
Marksville Prehistoric Indian Site	Marksville Prehistoric Indian site	Also known as the Marksville State Historic Site, it is the type site for the Marksville culture and is located about one mile southeast of Marksville, Louisiana.
Moorehead Circle		A triple woodhenge constructed about two millennia ago at the Fort Ancient Earthworks in Ohio.
Mounds State Park	Mounds State Park	Mounds State Park is a state park in Anderson, Indiana, featuring prehistoric Native American heritage, and 10 ceremonial mounds built by the Adena people and apparently also used by later Hopewell inhabitants.
Newark Earthworks	Newark Earthworks	In Newark, Ohio, the site consists of three sections of preserved earthwork: the Great Circle Earthworks, the Octagon Earthworks, and the Wright Earthworks. This complex was the largest earthen enclosure in the world. The site is preserved as a state park by the Ohio Historical Society.
Oak Mounds		Outside Clarksburg, West Virginia, in Harrison County, a large Indian mound; to the west of it is a smaller mound. These mounds have never been totally excavated but they were probably built by the Hopewell culture between 0 and 1000 CE.
Pharr Mounds	Pharr Mounds	Located near Tupelo in parts of Itawamba and Prentiss County, Mississippi, a complex of eight dome-shaped burial mounds. The site was in use during the Miller 1 phase of the Miller culture and was built between 1 and 200 CE. It is considered to be one of the largest and most important sites from this era.
Portsmouth Earthworks	Portsmouth Earthworks	The Portsmouth Earthworks is a large mound complex constructed by the Ohio Hopewell culture (100 BCE to 500 CE). The site was one of the largest ceremonial centers constructed by the Hopewell and is located at the confluence of the Scioto and Ohio Rivers. The majority of the site is now covered by the city of Portsmouth in Scioto County, Ohio.
Renner Village Archeological Site		The Renner Village Archeological Site is a significant Kansas City Hopewell culture archaeological site located in the municipality of Riverside, Missouri. Known by archaeologists as the Renner site(23PL1), the site contains Hopewell and Middle Mississippian artifacts. The site is one of several Kansas City Hopewell sites near the junction of Line Creek and the Missouri River.
Seip Earthworks and Dill Mounds District	Seip Earthworks and Dill Mounds District	A large hilltop enclosure in Ross County, Ohio and one of the sites which make up the Hopewell Culture National Historical Park.
Serpent Mounds Park		Not to be confused with the Serpent Mound in Adams County, Ohio, the site was constructed by the Point Peninsula complex peoples, a Hopewellian people who lived in central and southeastern Ontario, southwestern Quebec, and northern parts New York state between 300 BCE and 700 CE.
Sinnissippi Mounds	Sinnissippi Mounds	The Sinnissippi Mounds are a Havana Hopewell culture burial mound grouping located in the city of Sterling, Illinois, United States.
Shriver Circle Earthworks	Shriver Circle	The Shriver Circle Earthworks (33 RO 347) are an Ohio Hopewell culture archaeological site located in Chillicothe in Ross County, Ohio. At 1,200 feet (370 m) in diameter the site is one of the largest Hopewell circular enclosures in the state of Ohio.
Toolesboro Mound Group	Toolesboro Mound Group	A Havana Hopewell culture site, The Toolesboro Mound Group is a group of mounds on the north bank of the Iowa River near its discharge into the Mississippi. The mounds are owned and displayed to the public by the State Historical Society of Iowa. The mound group is located east of Wapello, Iowa, near the unincorporated community of Toolesboro.
Tremper Mound and Works	Tremper Mound and Works	The Tremper Mound and Works are an Ohio Hopewell (100 BCE to 500 CE) earthen enclosure and large, irregularly shaped mound. It was listed on the National Register of Historic Places in 1972. The site is located in Scioto County, Ohio, about five miles northwest of Portsmouth, Ohio, on the second terrace floodplain overlooking the Scioto River.
Trowbridge Archeological Site		The Trowbridge Archaeological Site is located in the vicinity of North 61st Street and Leavenworth Road in Kansas City, Kansas. It was inhabited c. 200–600 CE by the Kansas City Hopewell culture.

== See also ==
- National Register of Historic Places listings in Ross County, Ohio
- National Register of Historic Places listings in Warren County, Ohio
