= Shriver Circle Earthworks =

Ohio Hopewell culture archaeological site

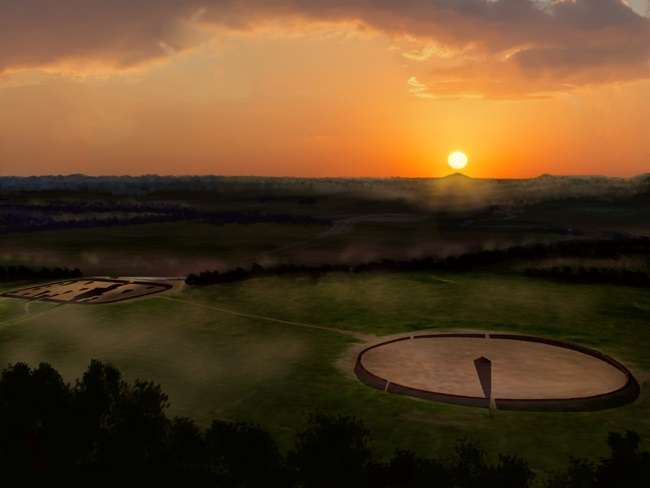
- Artist's depiction of the summer solstice sunrise at the Shriver Circle Earthworks

- Location within Ohio today
- 39°22′3.76″N 83°0′20.41″W
- Cultures: Ohio Hopewell culture
- Location: Chillicothe, Ohio, US
- Region: Ross County, Ohio

History
- Built: 200 BCE
- Abandoned: 500 CE

Site notes
- Architectural style: earthworks
- Archaeologists: Squier and Davis

The Shriver Circle Earthworks (33 RO 347) are an Ohio Hopewell culture (200 BCE to 500 CE) archaeological site located in Chillicothe in Ross County, Ohio. At 1,200 feet (370 m) in diameter the site is one of the largest Hopewell circular enclosures in the state of Ohio.

== Site description ==
The site is an oblong circular enclosure with an encircling ditch, located a little under 1,500 feet (460 m) to the south of the Mound City Group and a short distance west of the Scioto River. The oblong shape is anomalous among large Hopewell circles which are usually nearly perfect circles. A low conical mound measuring 40 feet (12 m) across and 5 feet (1.5 m) high was located at the enclosure's center. When first surveyed and excavated in 1846 by Ephraim George Squier and Edwin Hamilton Davis it measured over 1,000 feet (300 m) in diameter, 5 feet (1.5 m) in height, and 25 feet (7.6 m) in width. The ditch measured 20 feet (6.1 m) in width and was 4 feet (1.2 m) in depth. The embankment and ditch were broken into six segments by six unevenly spaced gateways around the perimeter. An early crude map drawn sometime before 1813 by Thomas Worthington, Ohio's sixth governor whose house Adena is the namesake of the Adena culture, has notations that indicate the enclosure and conical made had lost half of their height due to plowing by 1846 and were originally at least 10 feet (3.0 m) in height. The crude map also indicated nine gateways.

The central conical mound and the eastern gateway form a summer solstice sunrise alignment with a hill known as Sugarloaf Mountain located several miles to the east across the Scioto River valley.

== Excavations ==
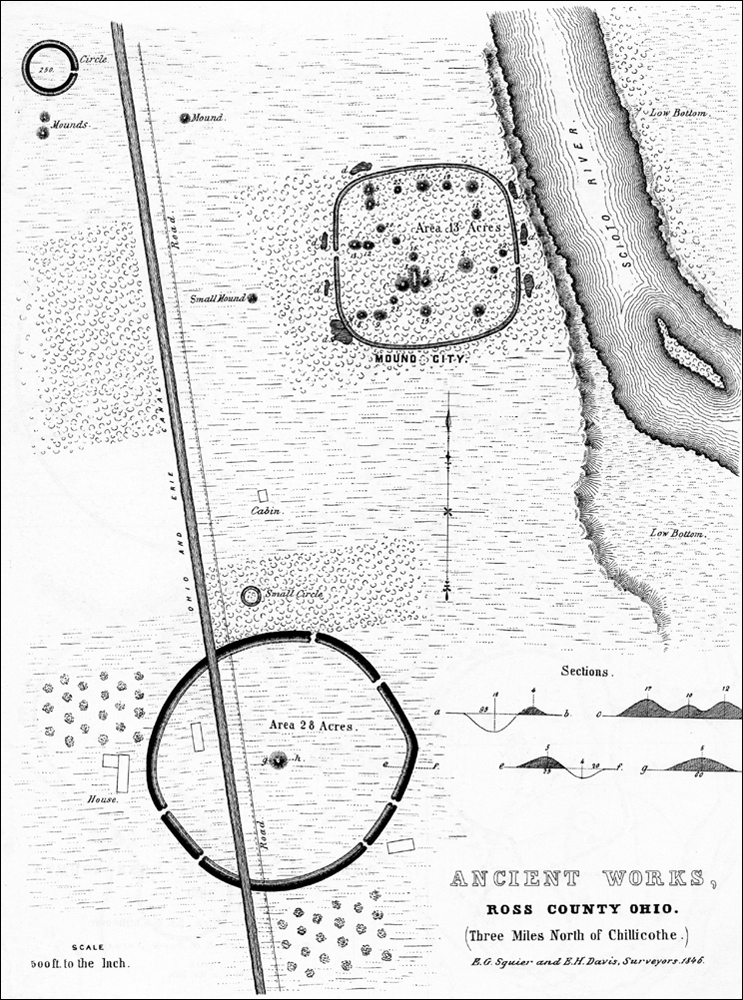
1840s map of Shriver Circle and Mound City in Ancient Monuments of the Mississippi Valley

Before excavations were first done at the site in 1846 a road and part of the Ohio and Erie Canal had already been constructed during the early 1830s on the western third of the enclosure. Squier and Davis partially excavated the central mound in 1846. They found a number of artifacts made from copper and mica as well as large quantities of charred bones. The artifacts resemble those found at Adena culture sites more than they do artifacts excavated from the nearby Mound City Group. They included the site in their influential book Ancient Monuments of the Mississippi Valley in 1848. They named the site after Henry Shriver, who owned the site and much of the farmland in the area during the mid-1800s.

Much of the site was damaged by farming in the 1800s and early 1900s. During World War I the United States Army built a military training base, Camp Sherman, on the site. The circle was graded down and the camp's parade ground was constructed in its location. After the war, the camp was razed and Ohio State Route 104, a road which runs through the site, was widened, causing even more damage. Part of the site was covered by the Chillicothe Correctional Institution when it was constructed in the early 1960s. By the early 2000s, when archaeologists from the Hopewell Culture National Historical Park began doing magnetic surveys, the site's features were so flattened that they could not be distinguished by eye from the surrounding fields, although they could be made out on old aerial photos. In 2005 a series of LIDAR investigations and field excavations were conducted at the site.

== See also ==
- Hopeton Earthworks
- Moorehead Circle
- Newark Earthworks
- Stubbs Earthworks
- List of Hopewell sites
