= Kansas City Hopewell =

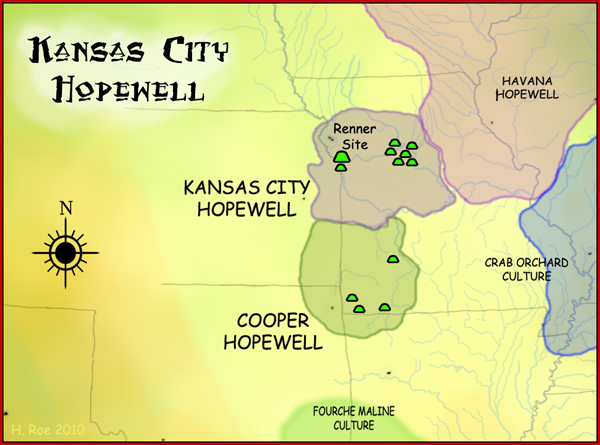
Local expressions of the Hopewell tradition, including the Kansas City Hopewell.

The Kansas City Hopewell were the farthest west regional variation of the Hopewell tradition of the Middle Woodland period (100 BCE – 700 CE). Sites were located in Kansas and Missouri around the mouth of the Kansas River where it enters the Missouri River. There are 30 recorded Kansas City Hopewell sites.

The sites are made up of distinctive pottery styles and impressive burial mounds containing stone vault tombs. It is however uncertain whether this culture developed locally when people adopted Hopewell traits, or if westward migrating Hopewell people brought it all with them.

== Hopewell Interaction Sphere ==
The Hopewell Exchange system began in the Ohio and Illinois river valleys about 300 BCE. The culture is referred to more as a system of interaction among a variety of societies than as a single society or culture. Hopewell trading networks were quite extensive, as has been found by the evidence of goods such as obsidian from the Yellowstone area, copper from Lake Superior, and shells from the Gulf Coast in locations distant from their origins.

== Kansas City Hopewell ==
The Kansas City Hopewell period is divided by archaeologists into three phases based on radiocarbon dates and changes in projectile point styles and ceramic decoration.

Phase	Dates
Trowbridge	1 - 250 CE
Kansas City	250 - 500 CE
Edwardsville	500 - 750 CE

The Kansas City Hopewell peoples grew a variety of domesticated plants, including squash and marsh elder. The majority of their diet seems to have come from wild resources such as seeds, nuts, deer, raccoon, and turkey. Their exploitation of the resources of the oak-hickory forest allowed them to establish permanent villages.

The Renner Village Archeological Site in Riverside, Missouri is one of several sites near the junction of Line Creek and the Missouri River. The site contains Hopewell and Middle Mississippian remains. The Trowbridge site near Kansas City is close to the western limit of the Hopewell. "Hopewell"-style pottery and stone tools, typical of the Illinois and Ohio river valleys, are abundant at the Trowbridge site, and decorated Hopewell style pottery rarely appears further west.

The Cloverdale archaeological site is situated at the mouth of a small valley that opens into the Missouri River Valley, near St.Joseph, Missouri. It is a multi-component site with Kansas City Hopewell (ca. 100 to 500 CE) and Steed Kisker (ca. 1200 CE) occupation. After 500 CE until about 1000 CE, the (Late Woodland period), the Kansas City Hopewell culture changed and evolved into different cultures. The people of this period started to live in small hamlets with two to three families and began to rely on more on agriculture. These groups are the Central Plains Village culture known as the Steed-Kisker Phase.

== See also ==
- Hopewell tradition
- List of Hopewell sites
- Nebo Hill Archeological Site
