= Nebo Hill Archeological Site =

Archeological site in western Missouri, U.S.

Coordinates: 39°12′36″N 94°21′15″W

- U.S. National Register of Historic Places
- Archaeological Survey of Missouri No. 23-CL-11
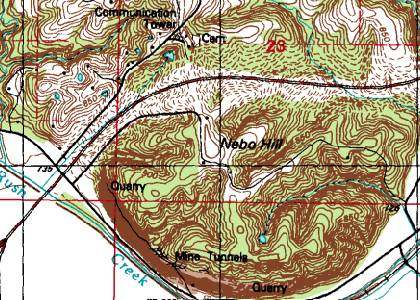

- Location within Missouri
- Location: Liberty, Missouri
- NRHP reference No.: 71000465
- Added to NRHP: March 4, 1971

Nebo Hill Archeological Site is a prominent former river bluff located in Liberty, Missouri. It has one of the highest elevations in Clay County. One source states the hill is named after the family who owned the property in the 1900s, while according to another source the name is a transfer from Mount Nebo in Jordan.

== Archaeological findings ==
The hill is now a large archaeological site, with several ancient Native American artifacts having been found there. This ancient culture has been named the Nebo Hill culture.

The ancient peoples lived along Fishing River, a tributary of the Missouri River. The culture flourished from 3,000 to 1,000 BCE. Their distinctive spearhead and axe designs, now known as the Nebo Hill axe, have been found as far north as Canada. There have also been many pottery findings. Artifacts from the Nebo Hill culture have also been found at the Renner site near Riverside, Missouri.

The Nebo Hill culture is a Late Archaic culture, and it is thought to be the ancestral to the later Kansas City Hopewellian culture.

== Nebo Hill Point Description ==
The Nebo Hill point is typically a large long, thick lanceolate point with an elliptical or diamond cross section. The blade is excurvate with the widest portion of the blade being at about the mid-point. Some examples have blades that cut inward towards the base giving a slight stemmed appearance. The base varies from convex to concave and generally lacks any basal or hafting region grinding. This point is manufactured using percussion flaking with pressure flaking used to touch op the blade forming a random flaking pattern.

== Geographic Distribution ==
This point is primarily found in northwestern Missouri prairie regions commonly found on bluffs overlooking river valleys. Found with decreased frequency outside of Missouri. This point has, very rarely, been reported into Minnesota.

== Similarity to Sedalia Specimens ==
Sedalia share many characteristics with Nebo Hill points. However, Nebo Hill points tend to be somewhat smaller and narrower with more pressure retouch and a thick, almost diamond-shaped cross section
