= Woodhenge (disambiguation) =

Woodhenge is a Neolithic Class II henge and timber circle monument within the Stonehenge World Heritage Site in Wiltshire, England.

Woodhenge may also refer to:

== Archaeology ==
- A general term for a timber circle
- Cahokia Woodhenge, near Collinsville, Illinois
- Moorehead Circle, near Lebanon, Ohio
- The woodhenge at Zwolle, Northeastern Netherlands

== Other uses ==
- Woodhenge, a song the 1979 album Platinum by Mike Oldfield
