= Lake Ridge Island Mounds =

Archaeological site in Ohio, United States

- U.S. National Register of Historic Places
- U.S. Historic district
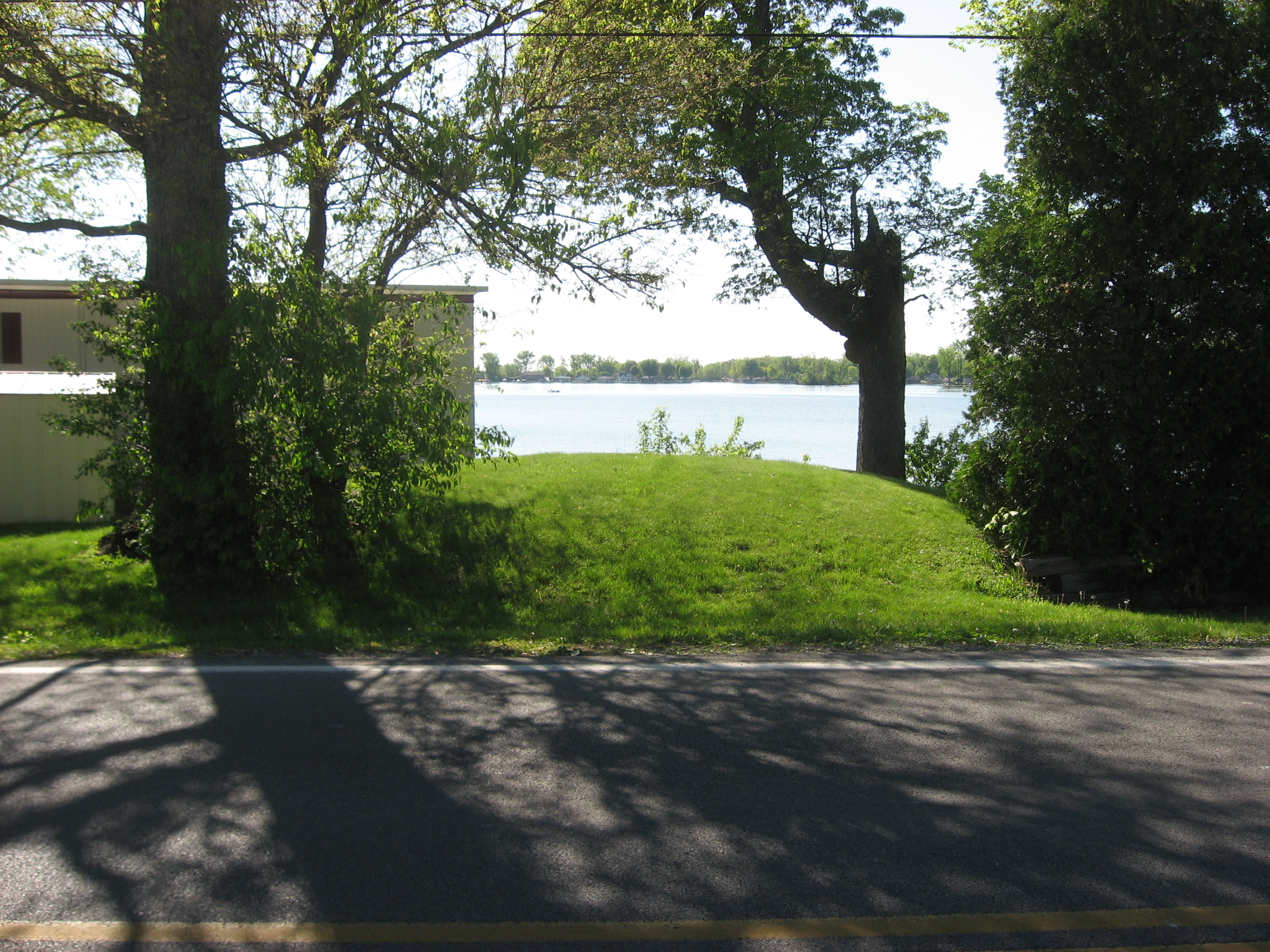
- One of the Lake Ridge Island Mounds

- Location within Ohio Location within the United States
- Location: Western side of State Route 368 on Lake Ridge Island in Stokes Township
- Nearest city: Russells Point, Ohio
- Coordinates: 40°29′26.808″N 83°51′34.452″W
- Area: 5 acres (2.0 ha)
- NRHP reference No.: 74001549
- Added to NRHP: October 16, 1974

The Lake Ridge Island Mounds (also known as the Wolf Mounds I-IV) are a group of small hills in Logan County, Ohio, United States that have been thought to be Native American mounds. Located in an area of about 5 acres (2.0 ha) at the northern end on Lake Ridge Island in Indian Lake, the mounds are near the village of Russells Point in the southeastern corner of Stokes Township. State Route 368 passes a short distance to the east of the mounds, even weaving at one point to avoid them. The four mounds on the island are small, not reaching a height greater than 3 feet (0.91 m) or a diameter greater than 40 feet (12 m); they are small enough that they appear to be natural knolls. A report produced in the 1970s observed that the mounds were in "excellent" condition at the time, never having been disturbed by artifact seekers.

An archeological survey of Logan County, published in 1914, revealed a cluster of mounds on the southeastern shore of Indian Lake, but no mounds on Lake Ridge Island were observed by the survey. Typical of the mounds studied in the survey is the Dunns Pond Mound, located in the community of Moundwood a short distance south of Lake Ridge Island; it is significantly larger than the Lake Ridge Island Mounds. The 1970s report highlighted the mounds as possible archeological sites, stating that they resembled small Hopewell mounds known elsewhere in Ohio and proposing that they were constructed by small groups of Hopewell who were isolated by time or distance from centers of Hopewell influence. As small mounds, they were assessed as being potentially significant for revealing the origins and demise of the Hopewell in the midwestern United States. For this reason, the mounds were listed on the National Register of Historic Places as a historic district in 1974, along with the Dunns Pond Mound; they are the only historic district in Logan County. In nominating the mounds for listing, the Ohio Historical Society noted the mounds' location within Indian Lake State Park as being significant for archeological education: it was hoped that visitors to the park would become aware of the significance of the mounds and consequently seek to preserve archeological sites on their own properties.

== See also ==
- List of Hopewell sites
