= Renner Village Archeological Site =

Archaeological site in Missouri, US

- Location in Missouri today
- 39°10′31.04″N 94°36′53.03″W
- Cultures: Kansas City Hopewell, Middle Mississippian culture
- Location: Platte County, Missouri, US
- Region: Platte County, Missouri

History
- Built: 1 CE
- Abandoned: 1200 CE

Site notes
- Excavation dates: 1937, 1954, 1980 to 1993, 2009

U.S. National Register of Historic Places
- Designated: April 16, 1969
- Reference no.: 69000123
- Responsible body: Local government

The Renner Village Archeological Site (23PL1) is a prehistoric archaeological site located in the municipality of Riverside, Platte County, Missouri. It was a village site inhabited from approximately 1 CE to 500 CE by peoples of the Kansas City Hopewell culture and through the Woodland period to 1200 CE by peoples of the Middle Mississippian culture. It was added to the National Historic Register on April 16, 1969.

== Excavations ==
Archaeologists have found artifacts relating to the Hopewell and Middle Mississippian at the site, which is one of several Kansas City Hopewell sites located near the junction of Line Creek and the Missouri River.

The site was first excavated by Waldo Wedel of the US National Museum in 1937. He discovered decorated pottery styles typical of Hopewell pottery. It was excavated for a second time in 1954 by the Kansas City Archaeological Society and a third time by Gary Brenner from 1980 to 1993.

During the summer of 2009 the site was the subject of local controversy over the building of a new playground at the location. The city council of Riverside listened to testimony from archaeologists and local residents and decided to pay for rescue excavations at the site. Cultural Resource Services Group at SCI Engineering was contracted to do the excavation work in the summer of 2009 and the area was opened to the public in the spring of 2010 as Renner-Brenner Park, named for two families who had owned the site.

== See also ==
- Hopewell tradition
- List of Hopewell sites
