= Stubbs Earthworks =

Archaeological site in Ohio, US

- Bigfoot Earthworks, Warren County Serpent Mound
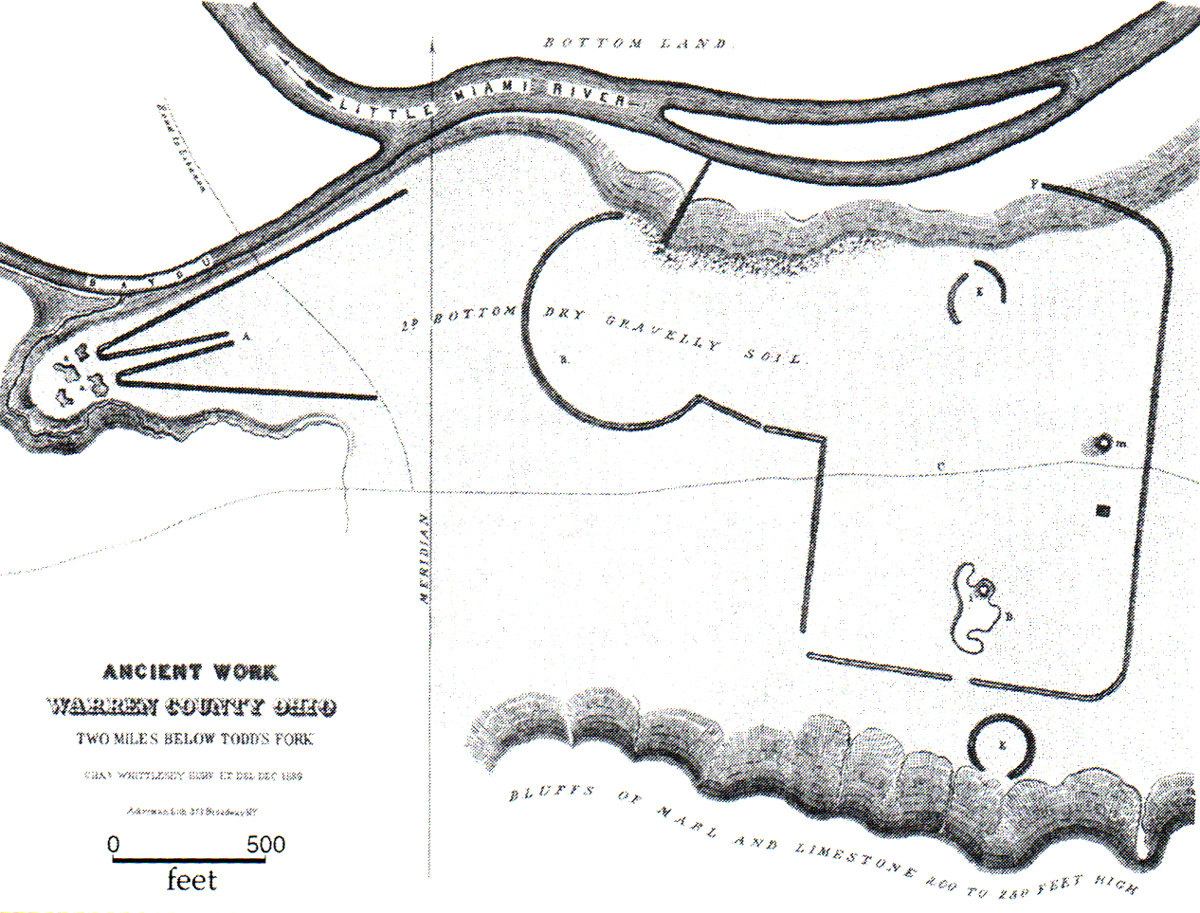

- Location within Ohio today
- 39°21′24″N 84°9′36″W
- Cultures: Ohio Hopewell culture
- Location: Morrow, Ohio, USA
- Region: Warren County, Ohio

History
- Built: 100 BCE
- Abandoned: 500 CE

Site notes
- Architectural styles: earthworks, timber circle
- Archaeologists: Frank Cowan
- Stubbs Earthworks
- U.S. National Register of Historic Places
- NRHP reference No.: 78002205
- Added to NRHP: April 4, 1978

The Stubbs Earthworks (33 WA 1) (also known as Bigfoot Earthworks and Warren County Serpent Mound) was a massive Ohio Hopewell culture (100 BCE to 500 CE) archaeological site located in Morrow in Warren County, Ohio.

== Site description ==
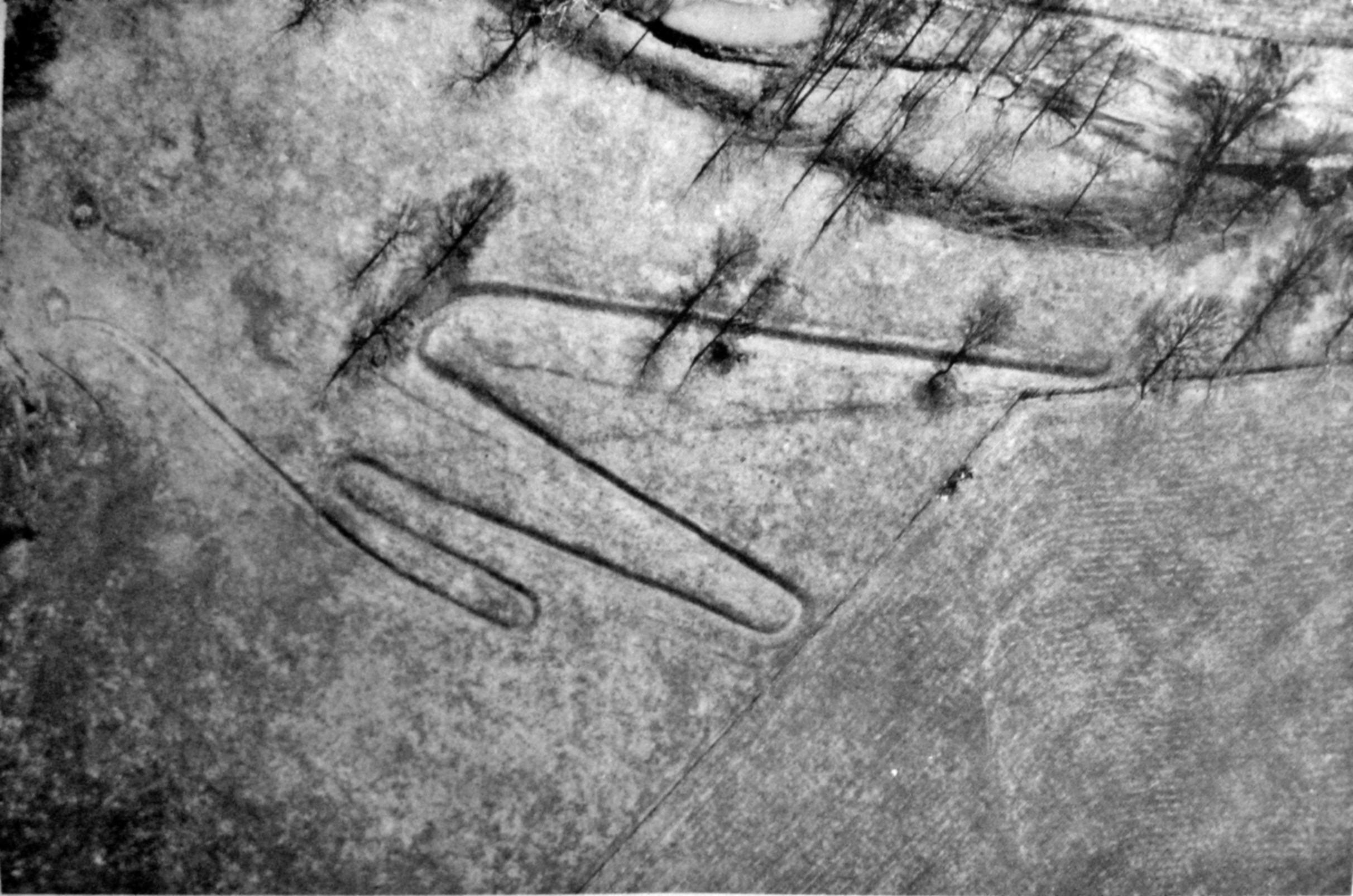
Aerial view of the "W" taken in 1951

The site was a ceremonial center consisting of an earthen enclosure with circular and rectangular elements and a separate smaller circular enclosure that contained the remains of a timber circle. To the east of the main enclosure on a high terrace overlooking the site was a large W-shaped earthwork. This was once thought to be a snake effigy mound similar to the Great Serpent Mound in Adams County, Ohio; although archaeologists do not currently think this was the case.

=== Timber circle ===
In September 2005 archaeologist Frank Cowan conducted excavations at the smaller circular enclosure; discovering a timber circle 240 feet (73 m) in diameter and composed of 172 large posts. Carbon dating of charcoal found in post molds at the site have dated the structure to 200-300 CE.

== Modern history ==
Although ignored by Edwin Hamilton Davis and E. G. Squier for inclusion in their seminal archaeological and anthrolopological work Ancient Monuments of the Mississippi Valley in 1847; the site was visited and mapped by Charles Whittlesey in 1851. Since that time much of the site has been destroyed by farming, gravel quarrying, and encroaching development. The Little Miami High School was constructed over part of the earthworks in 2000; although some of the site is still preserved on its grounds. It was listed on the National Register of Historic Places in 1978.

== See also ==
- Moorehead Circle
- List of Hopewell sites
