= Trowbridge Archeological Site =

- U.S. National Register of Historic Places
- Location within Kansas Location within the United States
- Location: Between 61st and 63rd Sts., north of May Ln. and Leavenworth Rd., Kansas City, Kansas
- Coordinates: 39°8′40″N 94°43′20″W
- Area: 3.5 acres (1.4 ha)
- NRHP reference No.: 71000337
- Added to NRHP: February 24, 1971

The Trowbridge Archaeological Site is located in the vicinity of North 61st Street and Leavenworth Road in Kansas City, Kansas. Discovered in 1939 by amateur archaeologist Harry Trowbridge in his backyard, it was inhabited c. AD 200–600 by the Kansas City Hopewell culture.

It was listed on the National Register of Historic Places on February 24, 1971, and placed on the Register of Historic Kansas Places on July 1, 1977.

== See also ==
- Hopewell tradition
- List of Hopewell sites
- Mound builder (people)
- Earthwork (archaeology)
