= Sinnissippi Mounds =

Archaeological site in Illinois, United States

- Sinnissippi Site
- U.S. National Register of Historic Places
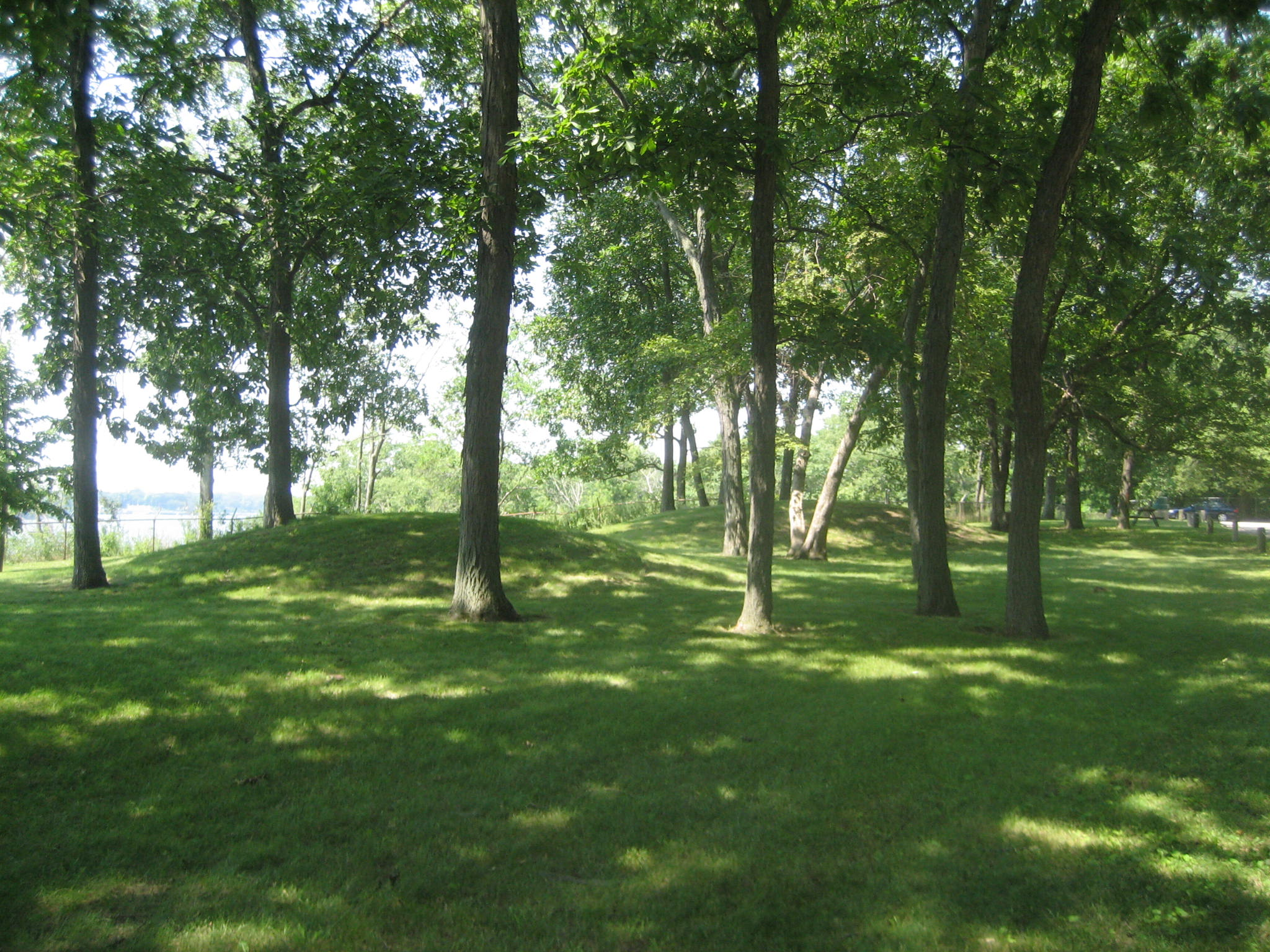
- Location: Sterling, Whiteside County, Illinois
- Coordinates: 41°47′50″N 89°39′35″W
- Area: 6 acres (2.4 ha)
- Built: c. BCE 1; 2025 years ago
- Architectural style: Burial mound
- NRHP reference No.: 79000874
- Added to NRHP: May 14, 1979

The Sinnissippi Mounds are a Havana Hopewell culture burial mound grouping located in the city of Sterling, Illinois, United States.

== History ==
The mounds are a product of the Hopewell tradition which flourished in the Sterling area around 2,000 years ago. At that time, the area was at the center of a vast trade network that stretched up and down the Mississippi River. Mounds such as the Sinnissippi are common throughout the Mississippi and Ohio River Valleys.

=== Discovery ===
The first European settler in Sterling, Hezekiah Brink, noted the mounds when he arrived in 1834. Among some of the other early European settlers was a group of men who were interested in starting a Science Club. The Sterling Scientific Club, in existence as early as the 1870s, made one of their goals the investigation of the burial mounds near the Rock River.

W. C. Holbrook investigated the mounds in 1877 and published a lengthy written account in History of Whiteside County, Illinois, published 1877. One year later, another written account of a mound investigation appeared in The Sterling Daily Gazette. After the 1870s, the burial mounds were looted and most of the archaeologically significant material removed.

=== Sinnissippi Site ===
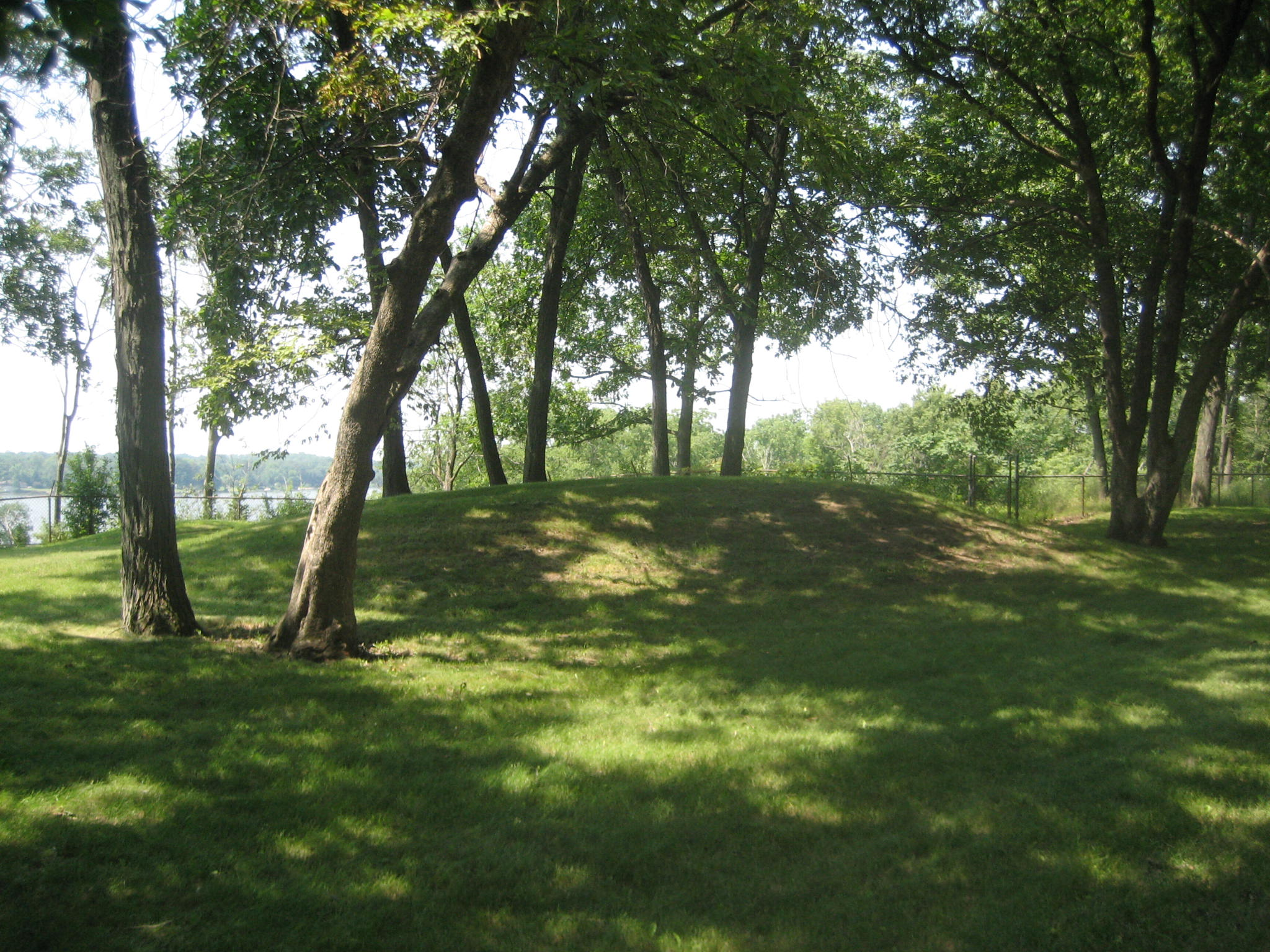
One of the larger-sized mounds found at Sinnissippi Site

The Sinnissippi Mounds are part of the Sterling Park District's largest park, Sinnissippi Park. The park was acquired in parcels beginning in 1934. The area of the park where the mounds are found, located on a bluff overlooking the Rock River, was added to the U.S. National Register of Historic Places on May 14, 1979, as the Sinnissippi Site. It is listed as one of the National Register's "address restricted" sites, despite its public nature.

== See also ==
- List of Hopewell sites
- List of burial mounds in the United States
- Mound builder (people)
- Earthwork (archaeology)
- List of archaeological sites on the National Register of Historic Places in Illinois
