= Toolesboro Mound Group =

Coordinates: 41.15°N 91.05°W

- U.S. National Register of Historic Places
- U.S. National Historic Landmark
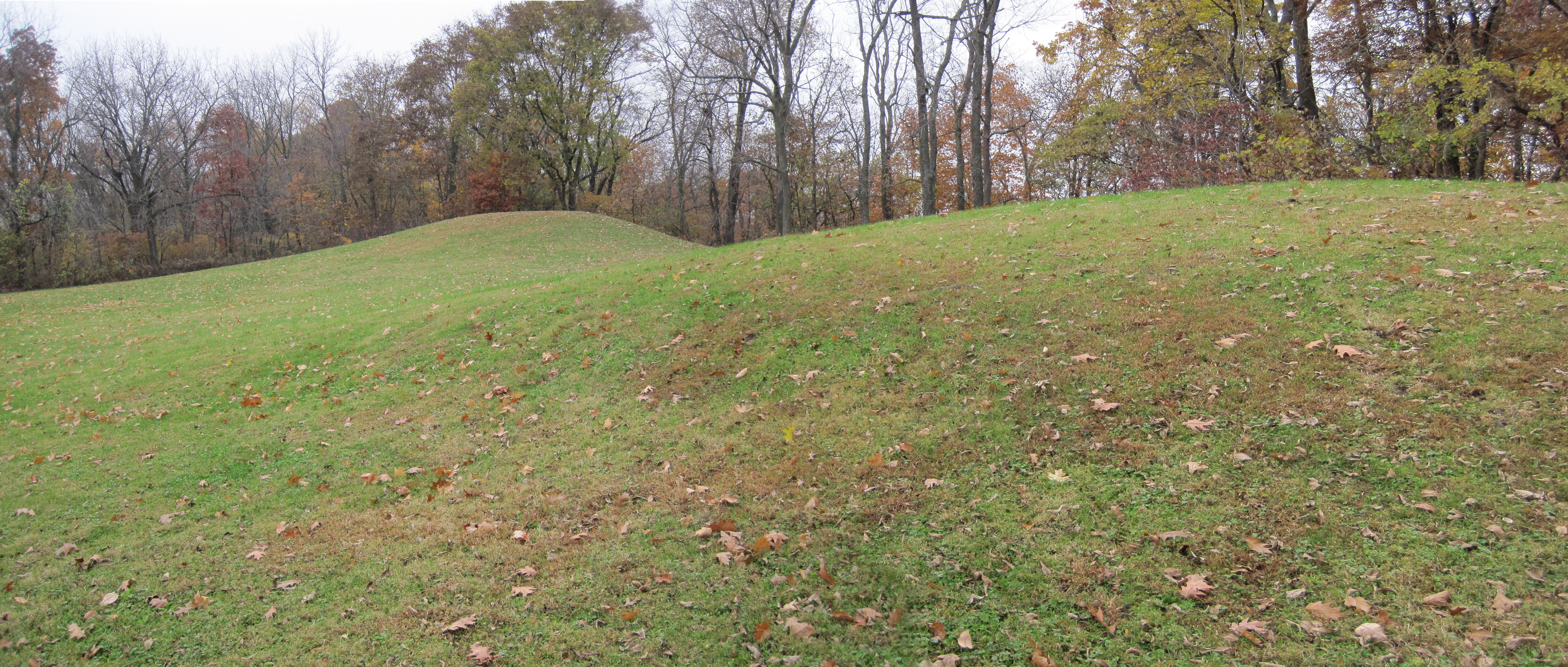
- The Mound in Toolesboro in November 2009
- Nearest city: Toolesboro, Iowa
- NRHP reference No.: 66000337

Significant dates
- Added to NRHP: October 15, 1966
- Designated NHL: May 23, 1966

The Toolesboro Mound Group, a National Historic Landmark, is a group of Havana Hopewell culture earthworks on the north bank of the Iowa River near its discharge into the Mississippi. The mounds are owned and displayed to the public by the State Historical Society of Iowa. The mound group is located east of Wapello, Iowa, near the unincorporated community of Toolesboro.

== Building the mounds ==
The mouth of the Iowa River was a superb location for people skilled in hunting and the gathering of food. Wild plants living in the rich alluvial soil of the two rivers could be supplemented with fish, shellfish, and waterfowl.

The Hopewell culture was a Native American celebration of the economic surplus, in food and other goods, created by harvesting the natural wealth of the American Midwest. Native Americans, in the Hopewell period, buried their dead in earthen mounds, accompanied by grave goods that displayed their status and possibly their religious and social leadership.

Grave goods discovered in Hopewell mounds include copper from Lake Superior, sea shells from the Gulf of Mexico, mica from the Appalachian Mountains, and obsidian from the region of what is now Yellowstone National Park.

It is believed that the Hopewell Interaction Sphere had extensive trading relationships that enabled them to transfer large quantities of high-status goods across wide sections of the North American continent. The Hopewell of the Toolesboro area would have been able to export blades cut from local flint. Local freshwater pearls were another highly prized item, exported and distributed over a wide area.

The surviving mounds of the Toolesboro Mound Group were built by the Havana Hopewell culture sometime between 200 BCE and 100 CE. The status of the people buried in the mounds indicates that the mounds were raised by people working within an organized community with an established social hierarchy. It is believed that there is likely to have been a Hopewell village located nearby, but as of December 2006 the location of this village had not yet been identified. Archeologists conjecture that the Iowa River, shifting its course frequently during the following two millennia and spreading alluvial silt over its path, may have flooded or buried the site.

== After the Hopewell ==
Since the original construction, other groups of people have been associated with the site. Close by is an earth work referred to as "the old fort" that was considered to be a part of the Toolesboro Hopewellian mound group. It is considered possible that this was actually constructed about a thousand years later by a different Native American group, the Oneota. To support this, there are two other sites in close vicinity, McKinney and Poison Ivy, that are both Oneota sites.

== Preserving the mounds ==
Americans exploring the Mississippi valley found a wide variety of Hopewell mounds up and down the river bluffs. Almost all of them were destroyed, either by careless excavation, grave robbery, or by the agricultural plow. In the late 1800s, the Toolesboro Mound Group was inexpertly excavated by the Davenport Academy of Natural Sciences, which recovered some artifacts.

Early records describe as many as 12 mounds near Toolesboro. Subsequent settlement and excavation have reduced that number to seven. The family of George M. Mosier, a local land owner, donated a parcel of land containing the mound group to the state of Iowa. In 1966, the Toolesboro Mound Group was listed as a National Historic Landmark, and in 1969 a small visitor center and parking lot were built near the site. The state has designated the Historical Society of Iowa as custodian of the site.

Of the seven mounds, only two are visible on the grounds of the Educational Center. The remaining five are located in an adjacent woodlot, and are separated by a wire fence from the Educational Center.

The Toolesboro Mound Group is a grave site of the Native Americans of the United States. The Historical Society welcomes visitors to the site, but requests that they not walk on or near the mounds themselves.

The site's address is 6568 Toolesboro Road, Wapello, Iowa.

== See also ==
- List of Hopewell sites
- List of National Historic Landmarks in Iowa
- National Register of Historic Places listings in Louisa County, Iowa
