= Junction Group =

The Junction Group is a site of earthworks located two miles southwest of Chillicothe, Ohio in the United States. The earthworks are associated with the Hopewell tradition. The site has been described as unusual by contemporary archaeologists. Excavations in the early 19th-century state that the site was not for fortification, but was used for religious purposes, including for burials.

The group of mounds and enclosures is located alongside Paint Creek. Today, most of the mounds and earthworks have been destroyed due to cultivation. Aerial photography has displayed cropmarks of the works. It has been noted that corn plants grow differently in the spots where the earthworks once stood.

== Survey history ==
=== Squier and Davis: 1845 ===
The site was surveyed by Ephraim George Squier and Edwin Hamilton Davis in October, 1845. They would report on their visit in their 1848 publication, Ancient Monuments of the Mississippi Valley. They report the site consisting of "four circles, three crescents, two square works, and four mounds." A circle enclosure on the eastern side of the site is described as being the primary earthwork at the site. Totaling 240 feet in diameter with square yet "much curved" three foot high walls. This enclosure is surrounded by a square ditch totaling 160 feet wide. A gateway on the southside of the square serves as the entrance. The gateway is 25 feet wide.

Squier and Davis describe a small mound, 130 feet southwest of the large enclosure. The small mound, at three feet high and 30 feet in diameter, is encircled by a ditch and a wall. A gateway is located on the northside of the wall. A crescent shape is described as "almost touching" the circle that surrounds the mound. It's 132 feet in diameter. Another crescent is 66 feet away past the first crescent. Upon survey, the describe it as "terminating in a mound of sacrifice". That mound is described as being seven feet high and 45 feet wide at its base. They describe this mound as commanding the "entire base of works."

Their excavation of the mound determined that it was made of clay. A shaft was dug from the middle of the mound. A layer of, what Squier and Davis describe as wood coals, were found three feet below the surface of the mound. The coals were three to four inches in thickness. These coals were also found outside the mound, mixed with clay and broken about a foot away. They figured that this mean that the mound had been disturbed at some point. Back inside the mound, they discovered a human skeleton in the layer of wood coal. They noted that it was "much decayed" and that the skull and jaw were crushed.

Underneath the skeleton was soil and as they proceeded towards the center of the mound the soil mixed with more coals. They found three more human skeletons seven feet beneath the surface of the mound. The skeletons were described as being in good condition. The skeletons were placed side by side, pointing west. They were covered with a mix of soil and clay. They reported that this covering was signature of a type of altar often found in religious purpose mounds. They noticed that the mound had been opened after its creation, and "its structure broken up." Squier and Davis believed that the three skeletons found were of Native peoples who utilized the earthworks as a burial site after the original builders had left the area. They believed this based on the quality of the skeletons preservation and the "shallow graves" that "modern Indians bury," their dead. Relics were also found in the mound.

After this discovery, Squier and Davis noted that they believed the site was of religious use, not for fortification. "They may have answered a double purpose, and may have been used for the celebration of games,".

== Films ==
- Save the Junction Group (2014)
