= Dunns Pond Mound =

Archaeological site in Ohio, United States

- U.S. National Register of Historic Places
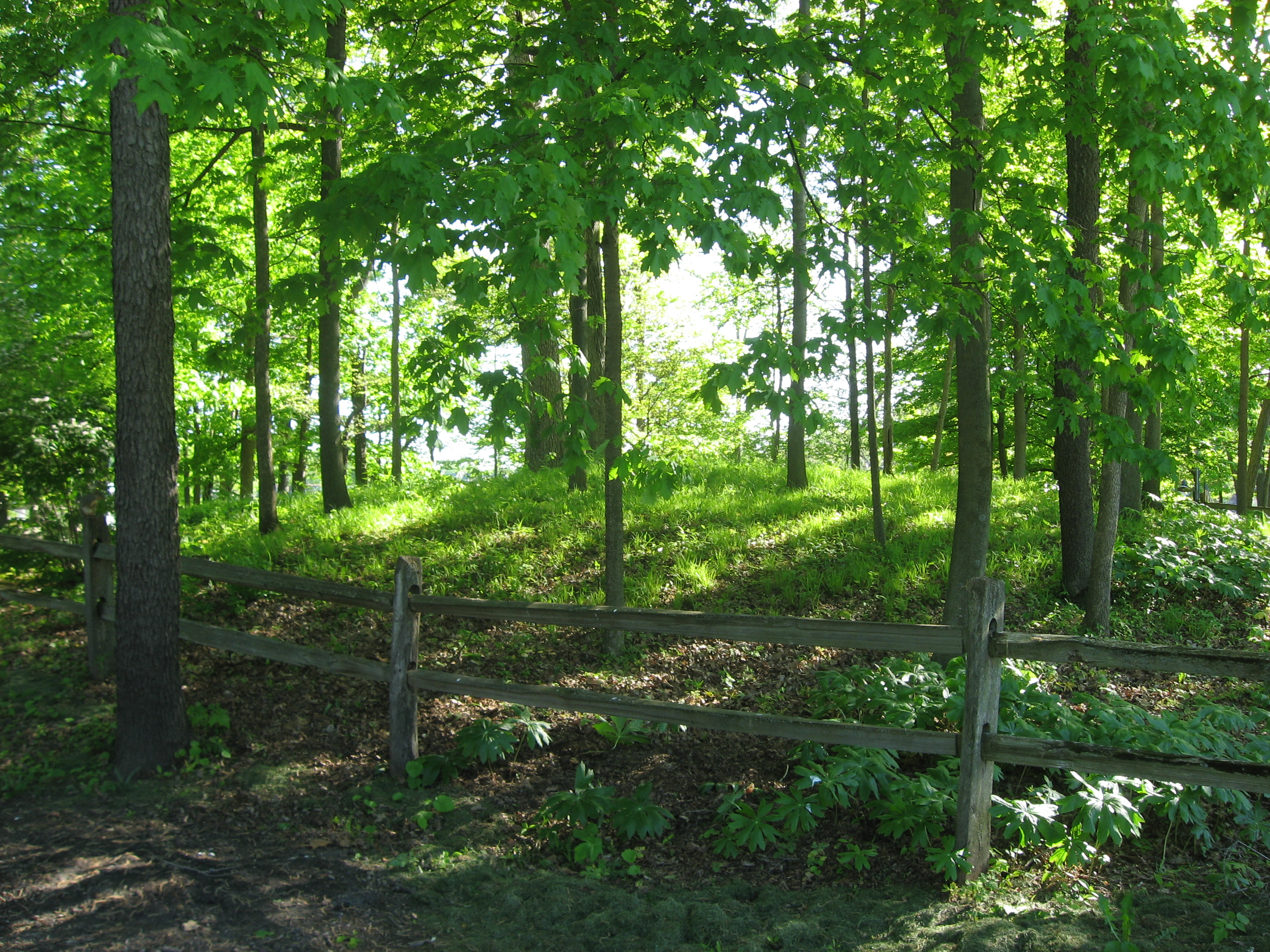
- Northeastern side of the mound

- Location within Ohio Location within the United States
- Location: Junction of Mohawk and Mound Aves., northeast of Dunns Pond
- Nearest city: Huntsville, Ohio
- Coordinates: 40°28′32.44″N 83°51′46.4″W
- Area: 1 acre (0.40 ha)
- NRHP reference No.: 74001548
- Added to NRHP: July 30, 1974

The Dunns Pond Mound is a historic Native American mound in northwestern Logan County, Ohio, United States. Located near Huntsville, it lies along the southeastern corner of Indian Lake in Washington Township. In 1974, the mound was listed on the National Register of Historic Places as a potential archeological site, with much of its significance deriving from its use as a burial site for as much as nine centuries.

Other Native American earthworks are located in the vicinity. A 1914 study found fifteen mounds on the southeastern side of Indian Lake and characterized this "remarkable" group of mounds as the premier location of archeology in Logan County. Another four mounds in Washington Township, which were not included in the 1914 survey, are located on Lake Ridge Island, a short distance to the north of Dunns Pond. These mounds, the Lake Ridge Island Mounds, were listed on the Register on the same day as was the Dunns Pond Mound.

== History ==
It is believed that the Dunns Pond Mound was built by the prehistoric Hopewell peoples at some point between 300 BC and AD 600. While approximately twenty mounds have been recorded around southeastern Indian Lake in modern times, it is likely that many more once existed in the area. When the Miami River was dammed in 1860 to support canal traffic, Indian Lake became far larger than its natural boundaries. Farmland became lake bottom and small hills became islands; the mound suddenly lay near the shoreline, and a small bay of the lake immediately south of the mound was later named Dunns Pond. Consequently, if villages or mounds existed northwest of the Dunns Pond Mound, they have been submerged.

Long after the expansion of Indian Lake, the Dunns Pond Mound was little known. For many decades, it was surrounded by woodlands, and the only human activity in the vicinity occurred along a bicycle and snowmobile path that passed over the mound. Excavation was attempted in the early 1940s, but was soon stopped without yielding any significant finds. However, the mound continued to receive attention from archeologists, and in 1974 it was listed on the National Register because it was likely to yield information about the peoples of the past. While the mound was likely built as a charnel house for Hopewell death rites, later Late Woodland peoples also used the mound as a burial site.

Interest in the mound by non-archeologists has increased in recent decades. In the first half of the twentieth century, local Boy Scouts proposed clearing the mound of brush as part of a conservation project, although objection by the owner prevented this project from being carried out. Increasing development around Indian Lake has included the creation of a small community around Dunns Pond, named Moundwood; the mound is located on the edge of the community. Access to the mound itself is no longer easily possible; the trail has been removed, and a fence placed around the mound.

== See also ==
- List of burial mounds in the United States
