= Tremper Mound and Works =

Archaeological site in Ohio, United States

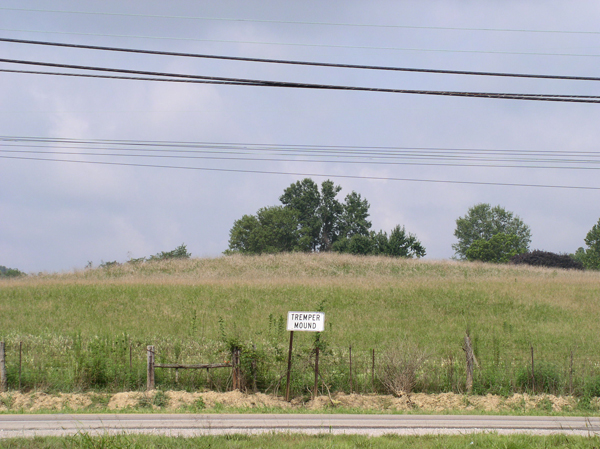
- A 2003 photo of Tremper Mound

- Location within Ohio today
- 38°48′05″N 83°00′35″W
- Cultures: Hopewell tradition
- Location: West Portsmouth, Ohio, Scioto County, Ohio, US
- Region: Scioto County, Ohio

History
- Built: 100 BCE
- Abandoned: 500 CE

Site notes
- Architectural styles: earthworks
- Tremper Mound and Works
- U.S. National Register of Historic Places
- NRHP reference No.: 72001041
- Added to NRHP: December 6, 1972
- Excavation dates: 1915
- Archaeologists: William C. Mills Ohio Historical Society

The Tremper Mound and Works are a Hopewell (100 BCE to 500 CE) earthen enclosure and large, irregularly shaped mound. The site is located in Scioto County, Ohio, about five miles northwest of Portsmouth, Ohio, on the second terrace floodplain overlooking the Scioto River. It was listed on the National Register of Historic Places in 1972.

== Site description ==
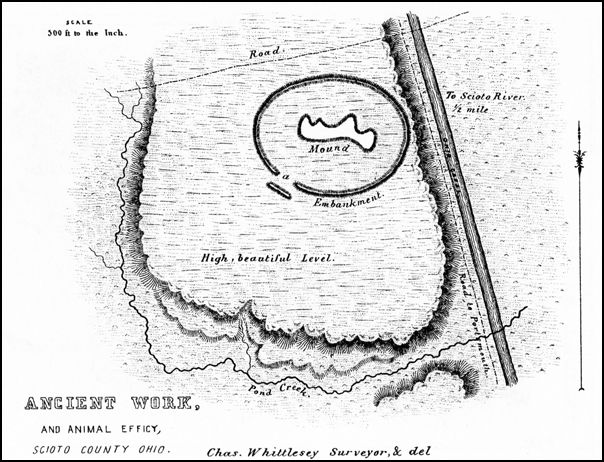
Squier and Davis diagram of Tremper

The Tremper Works include a large earthen enclosure in the shape of a flattened oval. Measuring 480 feet (150 m) by 407 feet (124 m), the oval was entered through an opening in the southwestern part of the enclosure. At the center of the oval is a large, irregularly shaped mound. Believed by some to be an effigy mound built in the shape of an animal, although there has never been any conclusive proof of this.

The site was surveyed in the 1840s by Charles Whittlesey for E. G. Squier and E. H. Davis, and an engraving was included in their book Ancient Monuments of the Mississippi Valley. The site was excavated by William C. Mills of the Ohio Historical Society in 1915. He discovered numerous postmolds at the base of the mound, revealing the outline of a wooden structure 200 feet (61 m) long by 100 feet (30 m) wide. The pattern showed that there had been a large building with several smaller chambers at its eastern end.

The site is privately owned and was once a working farm.

== Pipes ==
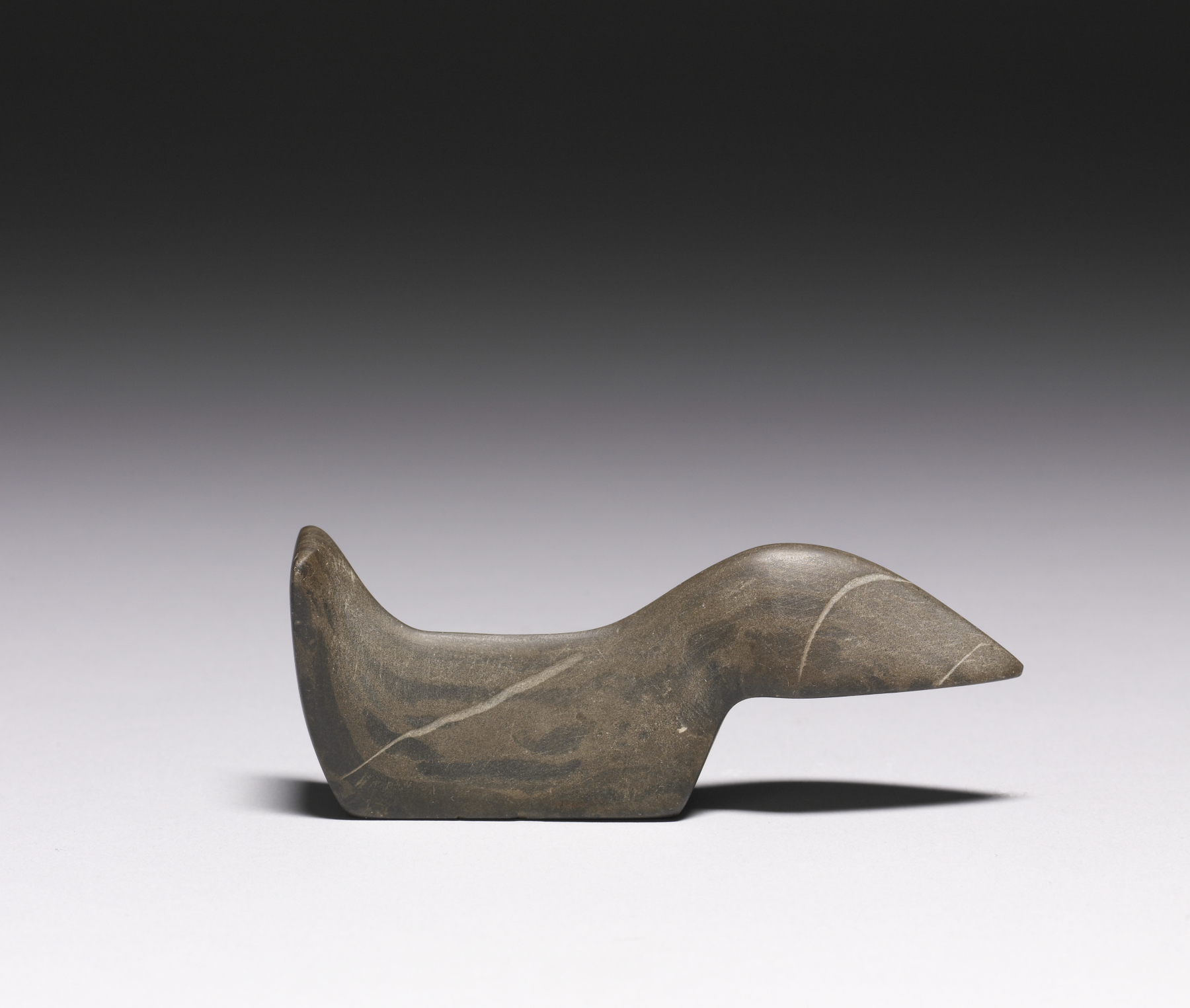
Bird Figure from Tremper Mounds

Another significant discovery made at Tremper were more than 500 objects that had been deliberately broken and left in one of the eastern chambers. The objects included 136 smoking pipes made of catlinite or pipestone. Ninety were effigy pipes sculpted in the shapes of animals, notably bears, wolves, dogs, beavers, cougars, otters, turtles, cranes, owls, herons, and hawks.

It had been thought that the material used to make the pipes had been quarried from Ohio pipestone outcrops across the Scioto River from Tremper, but new tests have shown that the majority of the pipes were made from Sterling pipestone from northwestern Illinois. Many of the Tremper pipes are on display at the Ohio Historical Center in Columbus, Ohio.

== See also ==
- Portsmouth Earthworks
- List of Hopewell sites
- List of burial mounds in the United States
