= Hopewell pottery =

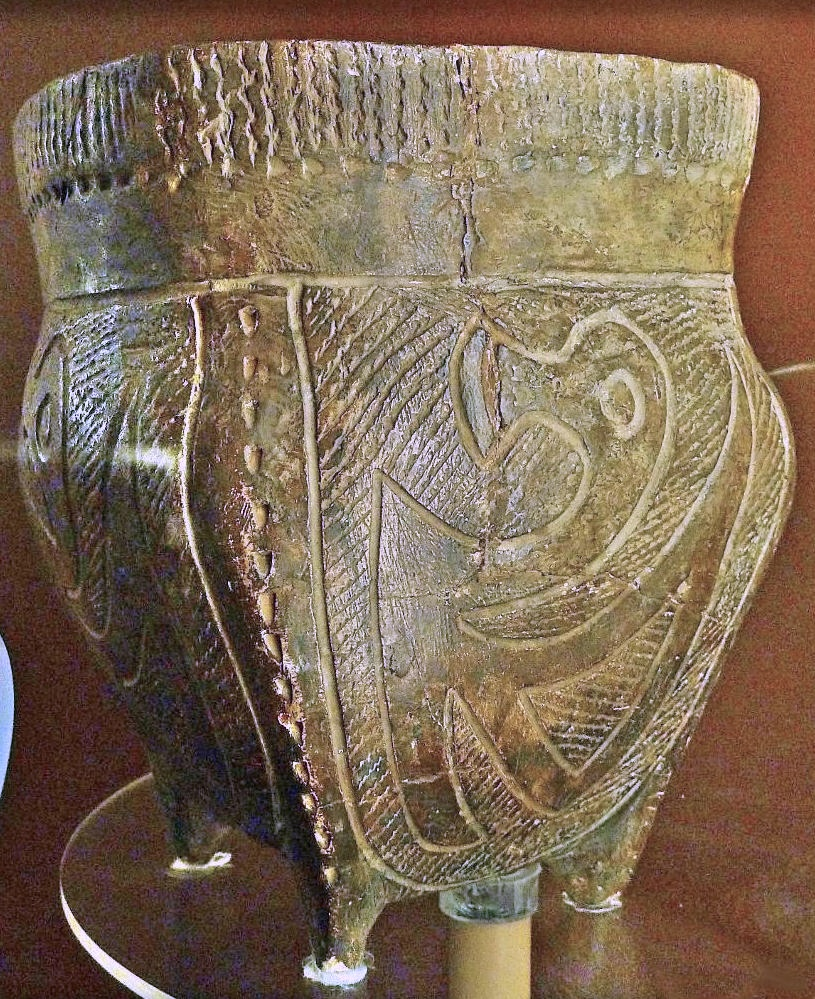
Hopewell pot with bird design at Hopewell Culture National Historical Park museum

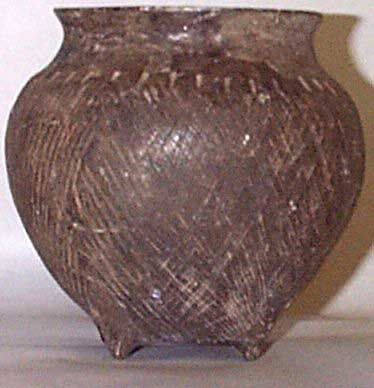
Hopewell jar from Hopewell Culture National Historical Park. Dated to c. 1–350 CE, it may have been imported from the southern Appalachian or Gulf Coastal Plain area.

Hopewell pottery is the ceramic tradition of the various local cultures involved in the Hopewell tradition (c. 200 BCE to 400 CE) and are found as artifacts in archaeological sites in the American Midwest and Southeast. The Hopewell were located around the Mississippi and Illinois rivers during the Middle Woodland Period, and the Hopewell Interaction Sphere spanned from the Gulf of Mexico to Ontario, Canada.

== Uses ==
This pottery was used in a variety of ways: from storage and cooking to holding offerings during burial ceremonies. Ceremonial pottery was noticeably more delicate and elaborate than pottery for domestic use.

== Techniques ==
Although there are many techniques and methods of pottery production, the method most likely used in the Hopewell culture was the coiled method. After making the initial form of the vessel a paddle and anvil would then be used to further shape and smooth the pot. The final two steps are decoration and firing.

Before firing, Hopewell pottery was often incised, stamped, or zone-stamped, in which different "zones" of the pot were delineating by incised, then stamped, leaving the surrounding areas smooth for contrast. "Hopewell ware" is characterized by crosshatching, bands with cambered rims, and highly stylized bird motifs.

== See also ==
- Ceramics of indigenous peoples of the Americas
- Fort Ancient culture pottery
- Mississippian culture pottery
- Plaquemine culture pottery
- Visual arts by indigenous peoples of the Americas
