= Moorehead Circle =

Triple woodhenge in Ohio, US

- Location within Ohio today
- 39°24′27.22″N 84°5′16.8″W
- Cultures: Ohio Hopewell culture
- Location: Lebanon, Ohio, Warren County, Ohio, US
- Region: Warren County, Ohio

Site notes
- Architectural style: timber circle,
- Excavation dates: 2009
- Archaeologists: Robert Riordan

Moorehead Circle was a triple woodhenge constructed about two millennia ago at the Fort Ancient Earthworks in the US state of Ohio.

The outer circle, discovered in 2005 by Jarrod Burks, is about 60 metres (200 ft) in diameter. Robert Riordan, Professor of Archaeology at Wright State University and lead archaeologist investigating the site, estimates that about two hundred wooden posts were set in the outer circle. Following the 2009 Field Season though, this estimate will likely be reevaluated given a huge number of tightly spaced post-molds found on the geographic south of the feature.

Thirty post-molds in all, were found in an eight meter long area excavated on the border of the circle. "A radiocarbon date on charcoal from a remnant trace of a post suggests it was built between 40 BC and AD 130. Burned timber fragments from the pit were dated AD 250 to AD 420." Both dates fall into the time period of the Hopewell culture, preceding the Fort Ancient culture occupation that predominates the site. The use or uses of the circles has not been determined, although it was likely ceremonial.

Dr. Riordan named the circle in honor of Warren K. Moorehead, first curator of archaeology for the Ohio Historical Society and a leading North American archaeologist around the turn of the twentieth century, who was largely responsible for preservation of the Fort Ancient site.

Other woodhenges have been found in the central part of the United States, including the Cahokia Woodhenge and Mound 72 Woodhenges (both located at the Cahokia site in western Illinois) and the Stubbs Earthworks, which is also a Hopewell culture site located in Warren County, Ohio.

== See also ==
- Cahokia Woodhenge
- List of Hopewell sites
