= Fortified Hill Works =

Archaeological site in Ohio, United States

- U.S. National Register of Historic Places
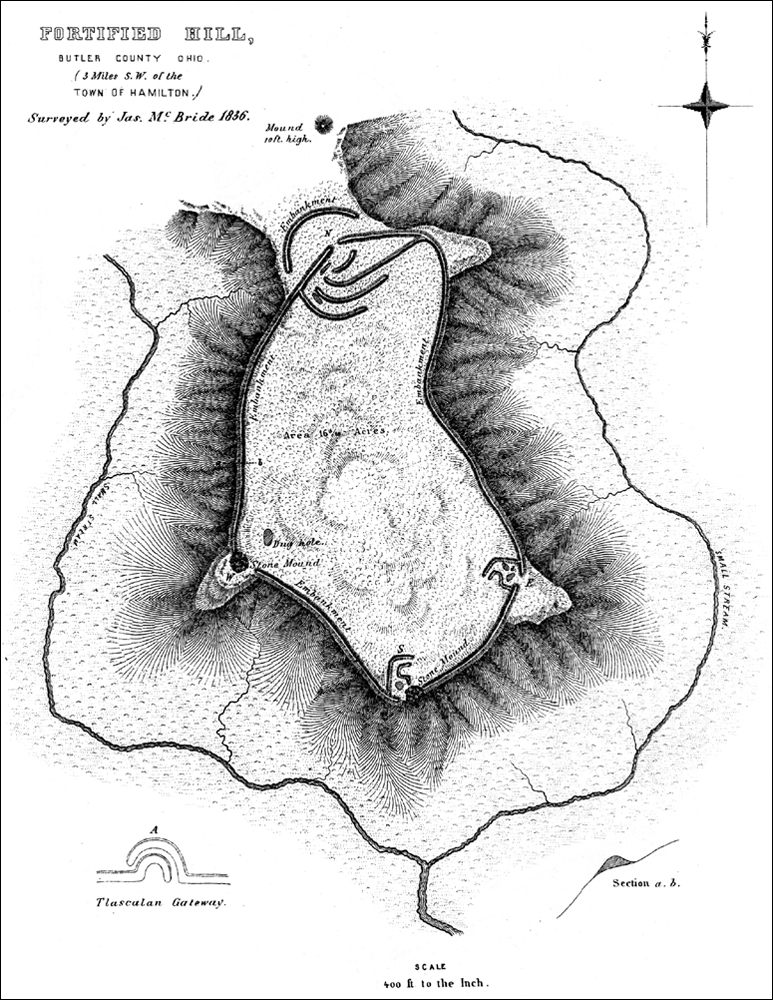
- 19th-century plan of the Works

- Location within Ohio Location within the United States
- Location: Western side of the Great Miami River, 3 miles (4.8 km) below Hamilton
- Nearest city: Hamilton, Ohio
- Coordinates: 39°21′45.75″N 84°35′33″W
- Area: 20 acres (8.1 ha)
- NRHP reference No.: 74001403
- Added to NRHP: July 12, 1974

Fortified Hill Works is a registered historic site near Hamilton, Ohio, listed in the National Register on July 12, 1974.

== Survey history ==
The site was surveyed in 1847 by Ephraim George Squier and Edwin Hamilton Davis. The works would be documented in their 1848 book, Ancient Monuments of the Mississippi Valley. They noted that the ditch around the earthworks was on the outside, instead of inside of the wall. As of 1847, they described the ditch as being "equal" at the steepest points of the hill, and "almost obliterated" in other areas. The wall is noted as being eight to ten feet high, and following the shape of the hill it was built on. There are three entrances into the earthwork.

The top part of the earthwork is described as enclosing a small circle, one hundred feet in diameter, with two small mounds inside of it. A third mound, which has been "truncated" was just north of the small circle. Both the small mounds had altars found in them after excavation. Ash and sherd were found in the altars. The two men believed it was a fort for defense, with the altars providing spiritual assistance. This group is called the Newark Group.

== Historic uses ==
- Fortification
