= Cloverdale archaeological site =

Archaeological site in Missouri, US

The Cloverdale archaeological site (23BN2) is an archaeological site located near present-day St. Joseph, Missouri. It is situated at the mouth of a small valley that opens into the Missouri River.

Excavations have shown that the site was first occupied by Kansas City Hopewell (c. 100 to 500 CE) peoples. Hundreds of years later, it was occupied by Steed-Kisker peoples (c. 1200) in the area of present-day Kansas City, Missouri. They were originally thought to be of the Plains Village period or tradition that was widespread in the central plains.

But archeologists have found evidence of significant differences, including habitation in farmsteads rather than villages, and pottery and building design more similar to the Middle Mississippian found at Cahokia, east of the Mississippi River, than to what was typical of the Plains Village. For instance, a house excavated at Cloverdale was similar to some at Cahokia: small, rectangular and partially subterranean, with wall posts set in individual holes.

In addition, Middle Mississippian shouldered jars with incised decoration were found at Cloverdale; these were typical of Cahokia style, as were water bottles, bean pots, and certain effigy forms found here. Other Mississippian items were many projectile points found at this site.

They have concluded that from about 1000-1250 CE, the people were migrants from Cahokia and similar Mississippian centers. The people increasingly adapted to local culture, resources and materials, developing a tradition that combined Mississippian and Plains elements.

Cahokia had developed a major urban center to the east of the Mississippi River, featuring numerous platform mounds and other forms of major earthworks, and gathering a large, dense population. It was the largest and central urban center of the Mississippian culture, which extended throughout the Ohio and Mississippi valleys and into the Southeast.

== See also ==
- List of Hopewell sites
- List of Mississippian sites
- Mississippian culture
- Mound builder (people)
