= Toolesboro, Iowa =

- Unincorporated community
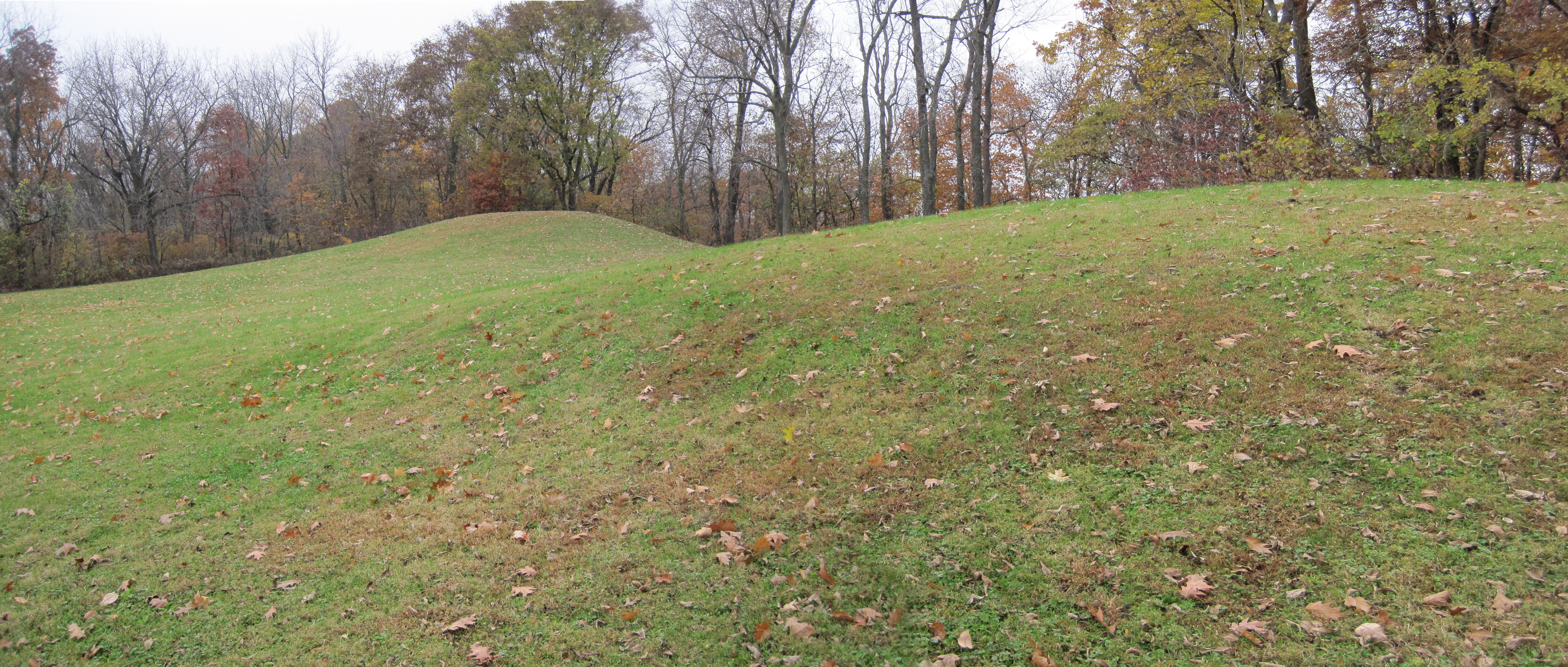
- Toolesboro Mound Group

- Location within Iowa Location within the United States
- Coordinates: 41°08′31″N 91°03′44″W
- Country: United States
- State: Iowa
- County: Louisa
- Township: Jefferson
- Elevation: 682 ft (208 m)
- Time zone: UTC-6 (Central (CST))
  - Summer (DST): UTC-5 (CDT)
- Area code: 319
- GNIS feature ID: 462278

Toolesboro is an unincorporated community in southeastern Louisa County, Iowa, United States.

The community is on Iowa Route X99 approximately seven miles southeast of Wapello and the Iowa River passes just to the east.

== History ==
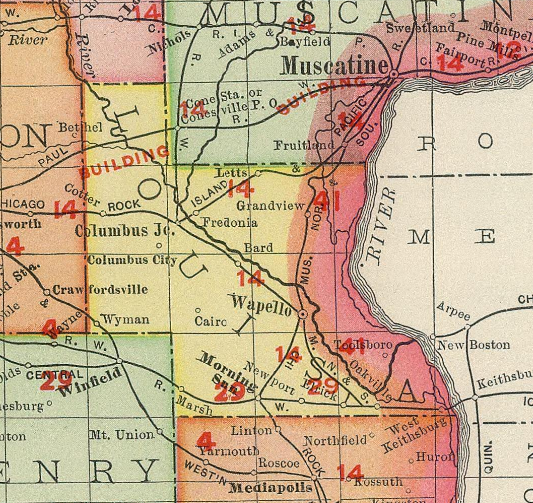
Toolsboro is shown on the 1903 Louisa County, Iowa, map

The Toolesboro Mound Group, a National Historic Landmark, lies north of the community.

Toolesboro was platted circa 1837 by William L. Toole. The population was 20 in 1940.
