= Steed-Kisker culture =

Precontact Native American culture

The Steed-Kisker culture is a cultural phase (name that archaeologists give to a group of culturally similar peoples) of the larger Central Plains Village tradition of the Plains Village period. This term applies to the precontact Indigenous peoples of the Great Plains region of what is now United States.

The Steed-Kisker culture primarily exists near present-day Kansas City, Missouri, from about 900 to 1400 CE. From about 1000 to 1250, they are believed to have originally been made up of a group of farmers who migrated from the Cahokia region east of the Mississippi River. As they adapted to local conditions and materials, they made changes in their traditional customs. They are considered to link the people of the Plains Village period to the larger Middle Mississippian culture and trading network.

Initially, numerous Cahokia-style projectile points were found here, and a trading link was theorized. But more recently, other evidence, such as "wall trench house construction, quantification of non-local trade materials", and evidence of two temple mound communities on the lower Missouri River (which were destroyed, used for fill in railroad development in the 19th century) have indicated more direct relations and early settlement by people from Cahokia.

The Cloverdale archaeological site near Saint Joseph, Missouri, is one of the more important sites associated with the phase, showing occupation about 1200 CE. Other sites with Steed-Kisker occupations include the Crabtree Site (23CL164), the Katz Site (23CL163) and the Steed-Kisker Site, for which the culture is named.

Cahokia was more than 320 miles by waterways from the Cloverdale site; it was located near a small tributary of the Illinois River and east of the Mississippi River in present-day Illinois, on a latitude with the future site of St. Louis. It had a large territory of influence along the major tributaries.

== See also ==
- Mississippian culture
- Plains Indians
