= Hopewell tradition =

Ancient North American indigenous civilization

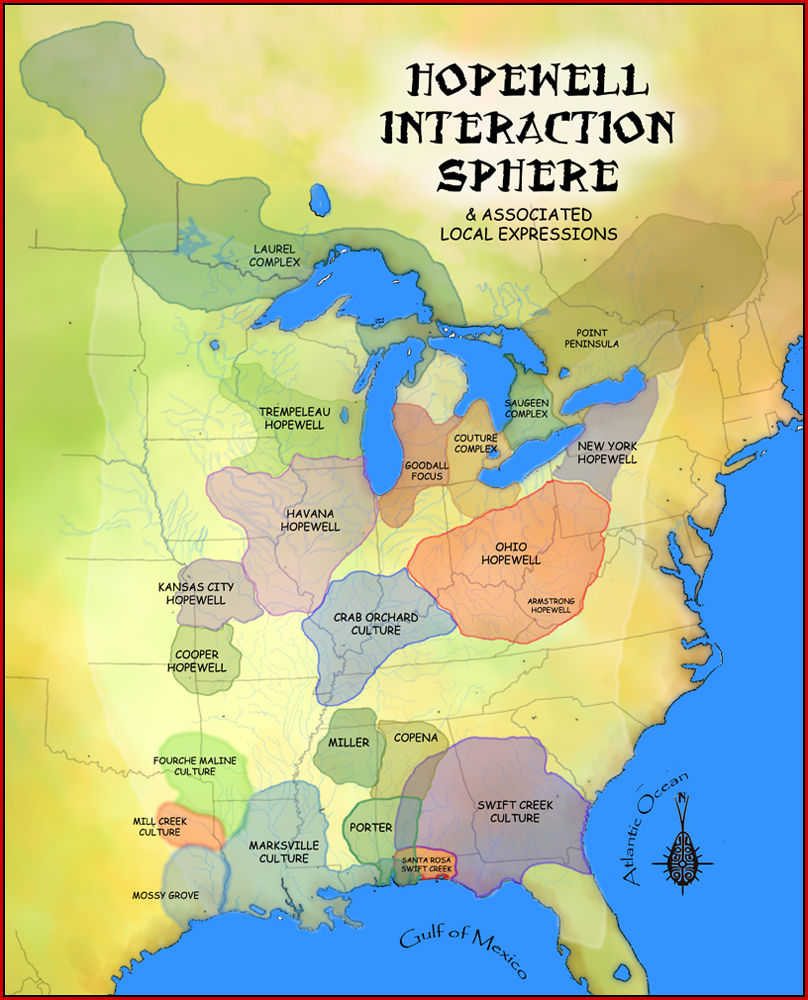
- Hopewell Interaction Area and local expressions of the Hopewell tradition
- Geographical range: Southern United States Midwestern United States
- Period: Middle Woodland period
- Dates: 100 BCE to 500 CE
- Type site: Hopewell Mound Group
- Major sites: Newark Earthworks
- Preceded by: Adena culture
- Followed by: Fort Ancient, Mississippian culture
- Defined by: Warren K. Moorehead

The Hopewell tradition, also called the Hopewell culture and Hopewellian exchange, describes a network of precontact Native American cultures that flourished in settlements along rivers in the northeastern and midwestern Eastern Woodlands from 100 BCE to 500 CE, in the Middle Woodland period. The Hopewell tradition was not a single culture or society but a widely dispersed set of populations connected by a common network of trade routes.

At its greatest extent, the Hopewell exchange system ran from the northern shores of Lake Ontario south to the Crystal River Indian Mounds in modern-day Florida. Within this area, societies exchanged goods and ideas, with the most activity along water transportation routes. Peoples within the Hopewell exchange system received materials from all over the territory of what now comprises the mainland United States. Much of the trade was in exotic materials brought to the major trading and manufacturing areas, where they were crafted into products and exported them through local and regional exchange networks. Hopewell communities traded finished goods, such as steatite platform pipes, far and wide; they have been found among grave goods in many burials even beyond the Midwest.

== Origins ==
Although the origins of the Hopewell are still under discussion, the Hopewell culture can also be considered a cultural climax.

Hopewell populations originated in western New York and moved south into Ohio, where they built upon the local Adena mortuary tradition. Or, Hopewell was said to have originated in western Illinois and spread by diffusion... to southern Ohio. Similarly, the Havana Hopewell tradition was thought to have spread up the Illinois River and into southwestern Michigan, spawning Goodall Hopewell. (Dancey 114)

American archaeologist Warren K. Moorehead popularized the term Hopewell after his 1891 and 1892 explorations of the Hopewell Mound Group in Ross County, Ohio. The mound group was named after Mordecai Hopewell, whose family then owned the property where the earthworks are sited. What any of the various peoples now classified as Hopewellian called themselves is unknown; indeed, their languages and even language families are unknown. Archaeologists apply the term "Hopewell" to a broad range of cultures. Many Hopewell communities were temporary settlements of one to three households near rivers. They practiced a mixture of hunting, gathering, and horticulture.

== Politics and hierarchy ==
The Hopewell inherited from their Adena forebears an incipient social stratification. This increased social stability and reinforced settled living, specialized use of resources, and probably population growth. Hopewell societies cremated most of their deceased and reserved burial for only the most important people. In some sites, hunters apparently were given a higher status in the community: their graves were more elaborate and contained more status goods.

The Hopewellian peoples had leaders, but they did not command armies of slaves or soldiers. These cultures likely accorded certain families a special place of privilege. Some scholars suggest that these societies were marked by the emergence of "big-men", leaders whose influence depended on their skill at persuasion in important matters such as trade and religion. They also perhaps augmented their influence by cultivating reciprocal obligations with other important community members. The emergence of big-men was a step toward the development of highly structured and stratified chiefdoms.

The Hopewell settlements were linked by extensive and complex trading routes; these operated also as communication networks, and were a means to bring people together for important ceremonies.

== Mounds ==
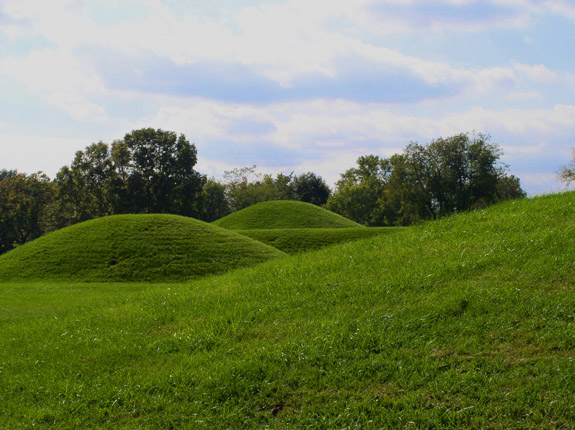
Hopewell mounds from the Mound City Group in Ohio

Today, the best-surviving features of the Hopewell tradition era are earthwork mounds, and researchers continue to speculate about their purposes. Later geometric earthworks built by cultures following the Hopewell are some of the most impressive Native American monuments throughout American prehistory. Eastern Woodlands mounds typically have various geometric shapes and rise to impressive heights. Some of the gigantic sculpted earthworks, described as effigy mounds, were constructed in the shape of animals, birds, or writhing serpents.

Several scientists, including Bradley T. Lepper, hypothesize that the Octagon, in the Newark Earthworks at Newark, Ohio, was a lunar observatory. He believes that it is oriented to the 18.6-year cycle of minimum and maximum lunar risings and settings on the local horizon. The Octagon covers more than 50 acres (20 ha), the size of 100 football pitches. John Eddy completed an unpublished survey in 1978, and proposed a lunar major alignment for the Octagon. Ray Hively and Robert Horn of Earlham College in Richmond, Indiana, were the first researchers to analyze numerous lunar sightlines at the Newark Earthworks (1982) and the High Banks Works (1984) in Chillicothe, Ohio.

Embankment walls of the Octagon at the Newark Earthworks, Ohio, 2026

Christopher Turner noted that the Fairground Circle in Newark, Ohio aligns to the sunrise on May 4, i.e. that it marks the May cross-quarter sunrise. In 1983, Turner demonstrated that the Hopeton earthworks encode various sunrise and moonrise patterns, including the winter and summer solstices, the equinoxes, the cross-quarter days, the lunar maximum events, and the lunar minimum events, due to their precise straight and parallel lines.

William F. Romain has written a book on the subject of "astronomers, geometers, and magicians" at the earthworks.

Many of the mounds also contain various types of human burials, some containing precious grave goods such as ornaments of copper, mica and obsidian imported from hundreds of miles away. Stone and ceramics were also fashioned into intricate shapes.

== Artwork ==
The Hopewell created some of the finest craftwork and artwork of the Americas. Most of their works had some religious significance, and their graves were filled with necklaces, ornate carvings made from bone or wood, decorated ceremonial pottery, ear covers, and pendants. Some graves were lined with woven mats, mica (a mineral consisting of thin glassy sheets), or stones. The Hopewell produced artwork in a greater variety and with more exotic materials than their predecessors the Adena. Grizzly bear teeth, fresh water pearls, sea shells, sharks' teeth, copper, and small quantities of silver were crafted as elegant pieces. The Hopewell artisans were expert carvers of pipestone, and many of the mortuary mounds are full of exquisitely carved statues and pipes.

Excavation of the Mound of Pipes at Mound City found more than 200 stone smoking pipes; these depicted animals and birds in well-realized three-dimensional form. More than 130 such artifacts were excavated from the Tremper site in Scioto County. Some artwork was made from carved human bones. A rare mask found at Mound City was created using a human skull as a face plate. Hopewell artists created both abstract and realistic portrayals of the human form. One tubular pipe is so accurate in form that the model was identified by researchers as an achondroplastic (chondrodystropic) dwarf. Many other figurines are highly detailed in dress, ornamentation, and hairstyles. An example of the abstract human forms is the "Mica Hand" from the Hopewell Site in Ross County, Ohio. Delicately cut from a piece of mica 11 in × 6 in (280 mm × 150 mm), the hand carving was likely worn or carried for public viewing. They also made beaded work.

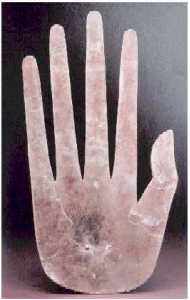
Carved mica hand, Hopewell Mounds

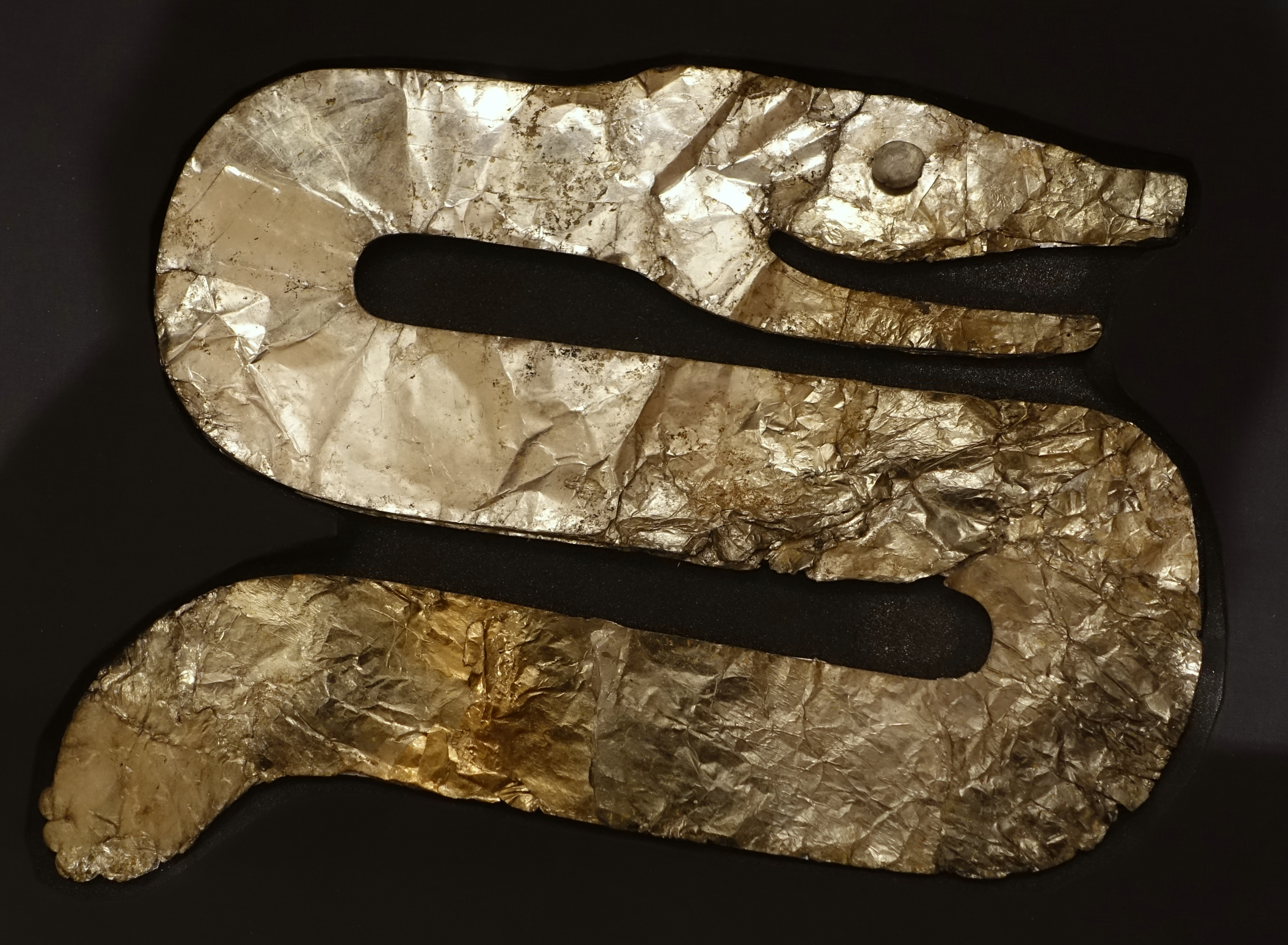
Serpent effigy, Turner Group, Mound 4, Little Miami Valley, OH

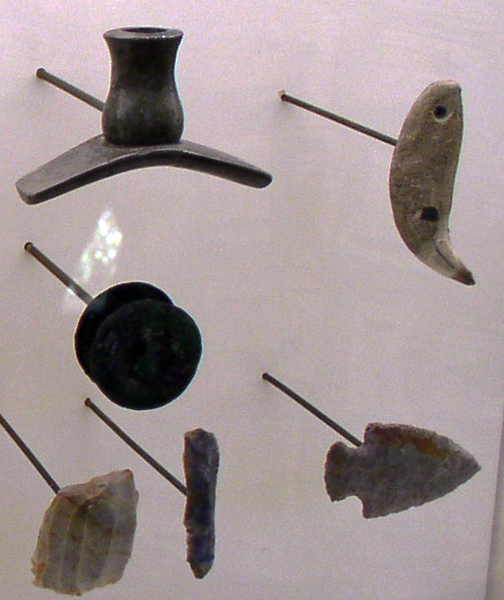
Hopewell pipe, points, and earspool on display at Serpent Mound

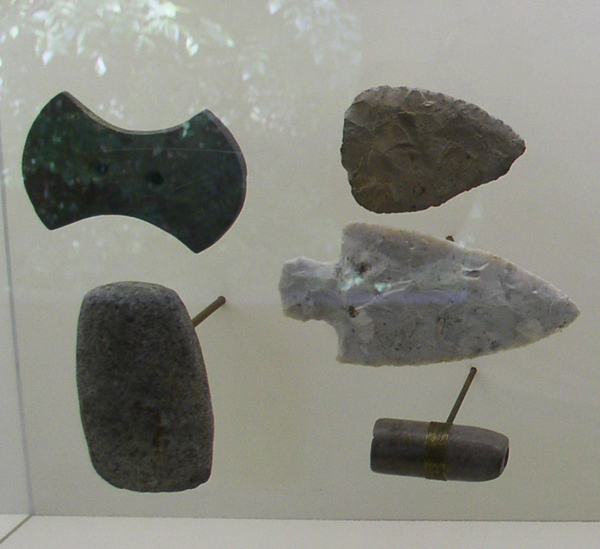
Gorgets and points from the Adena culture, found at Serpent Mound

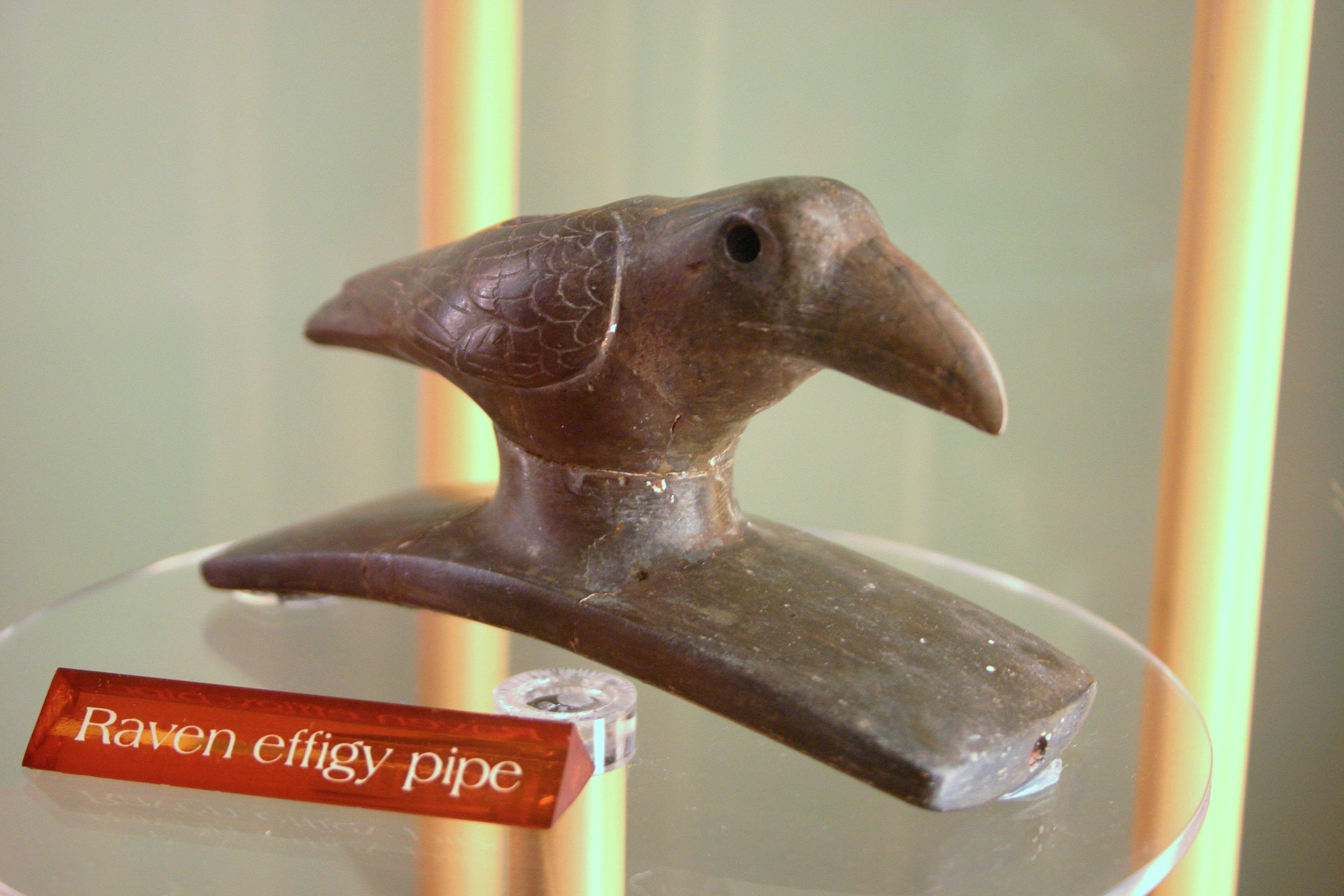
Raven effigy pipe, Mound City

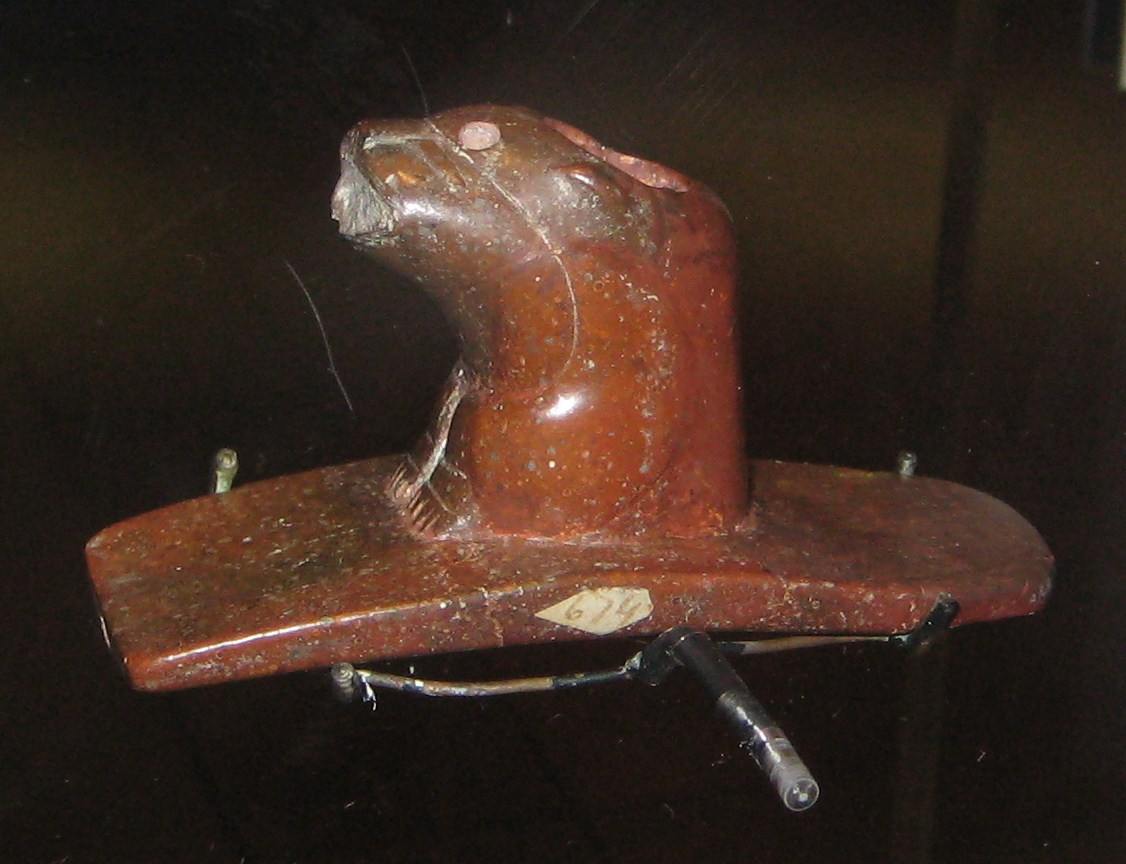
Otter effigy pipe, Mound City

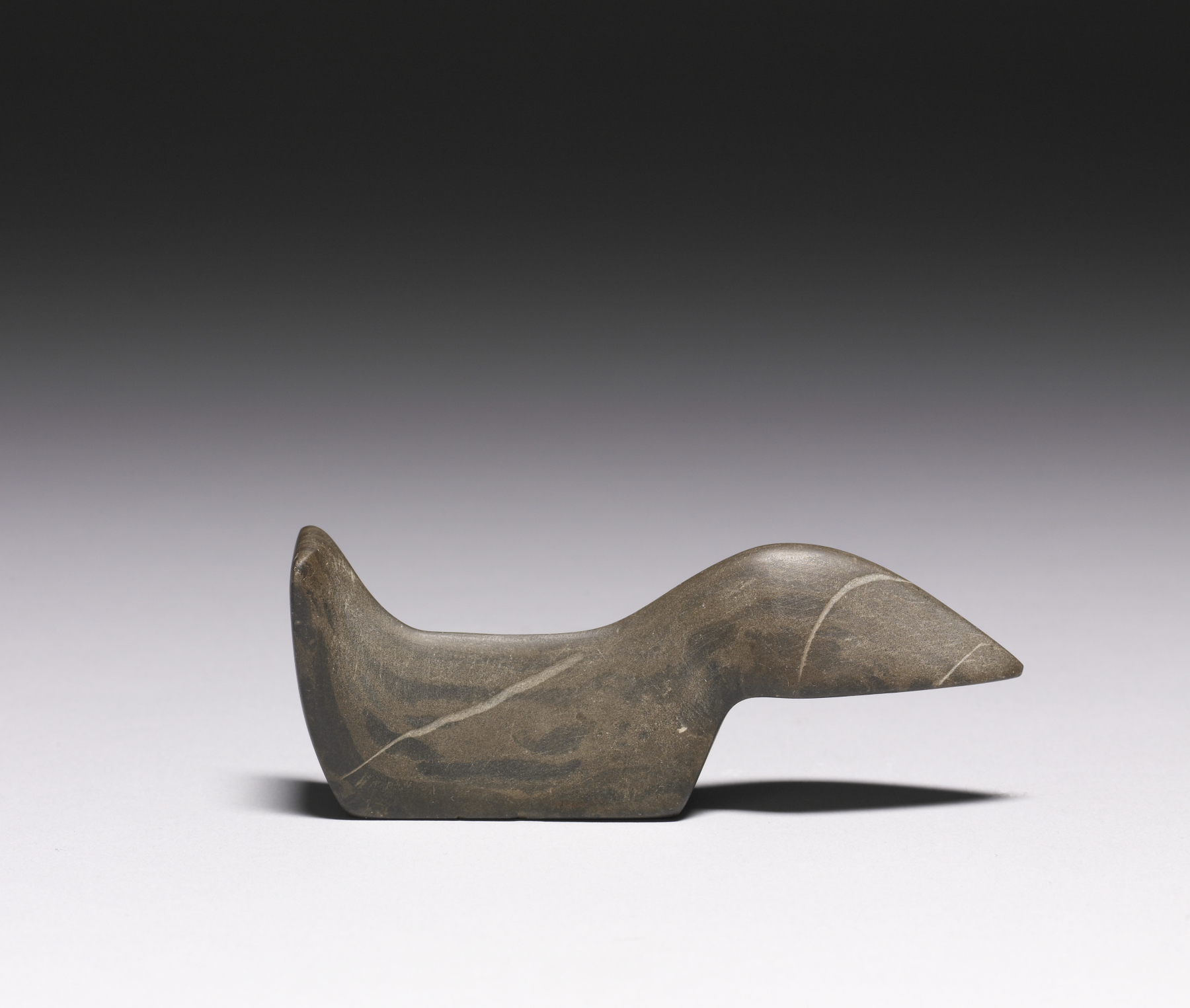
Bird figure, Tremper Mounds

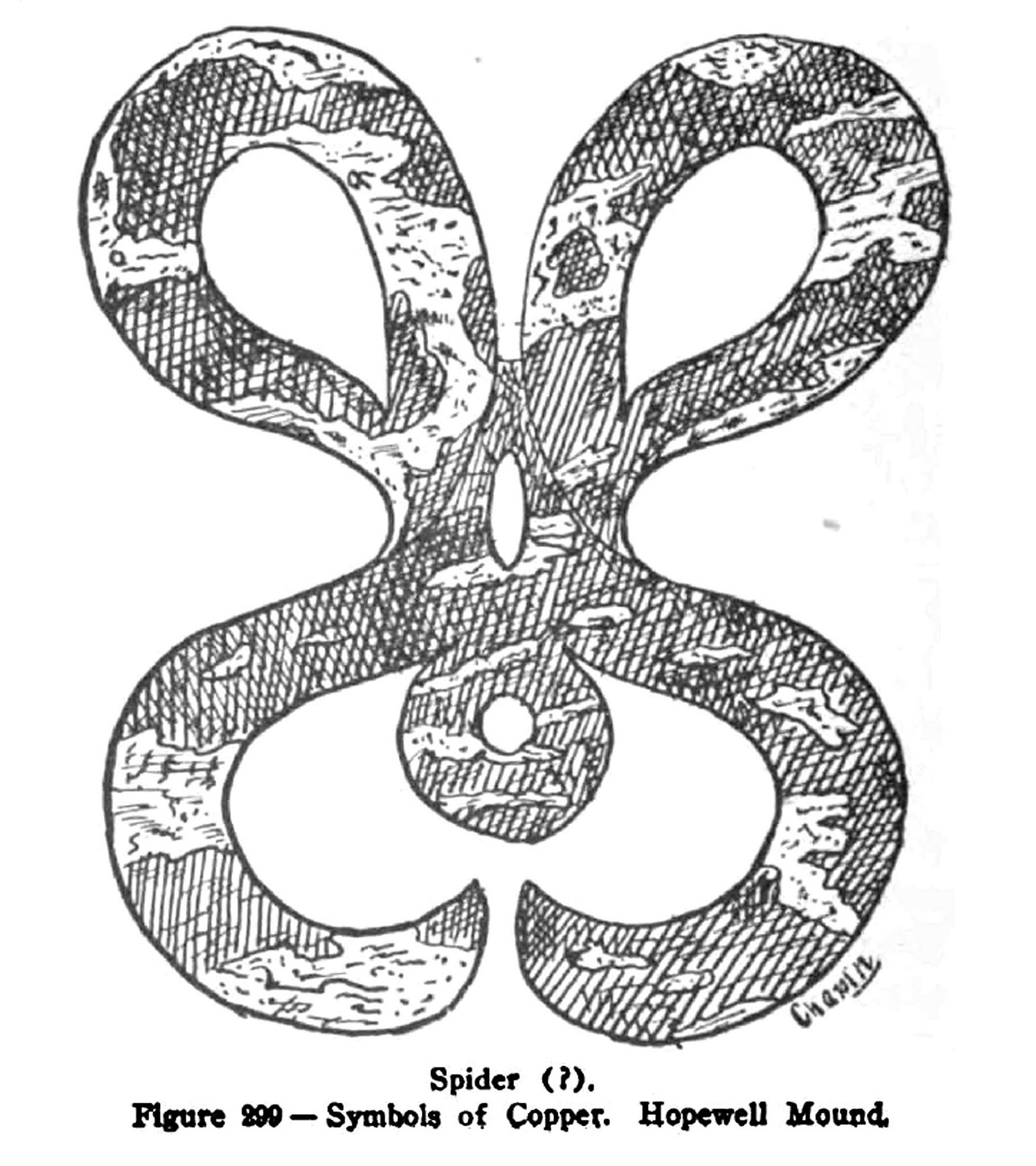
Copper spider(?) from a Ross County mound

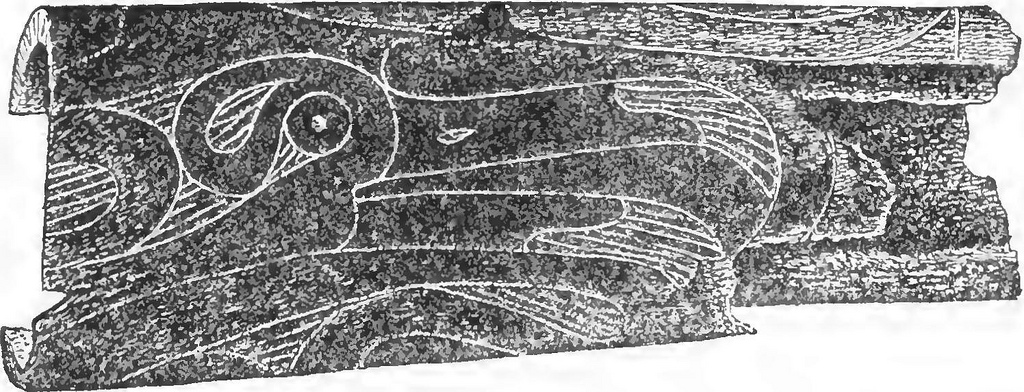
Bird head carved on bone, Hopewell Mounds

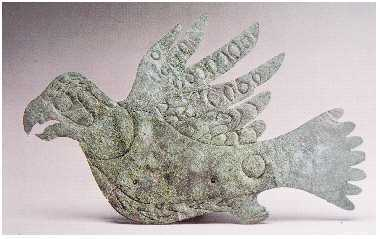
Repoussé copper falcon, Mound City

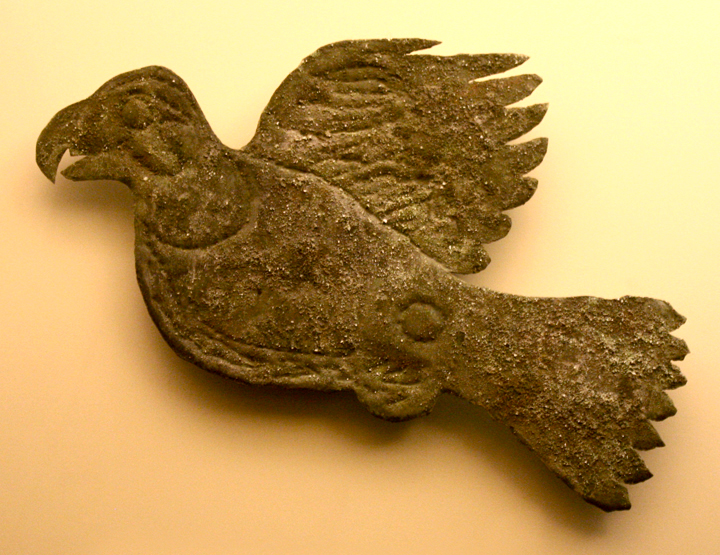
Repoussé copper falcon at American Museum of Natural History

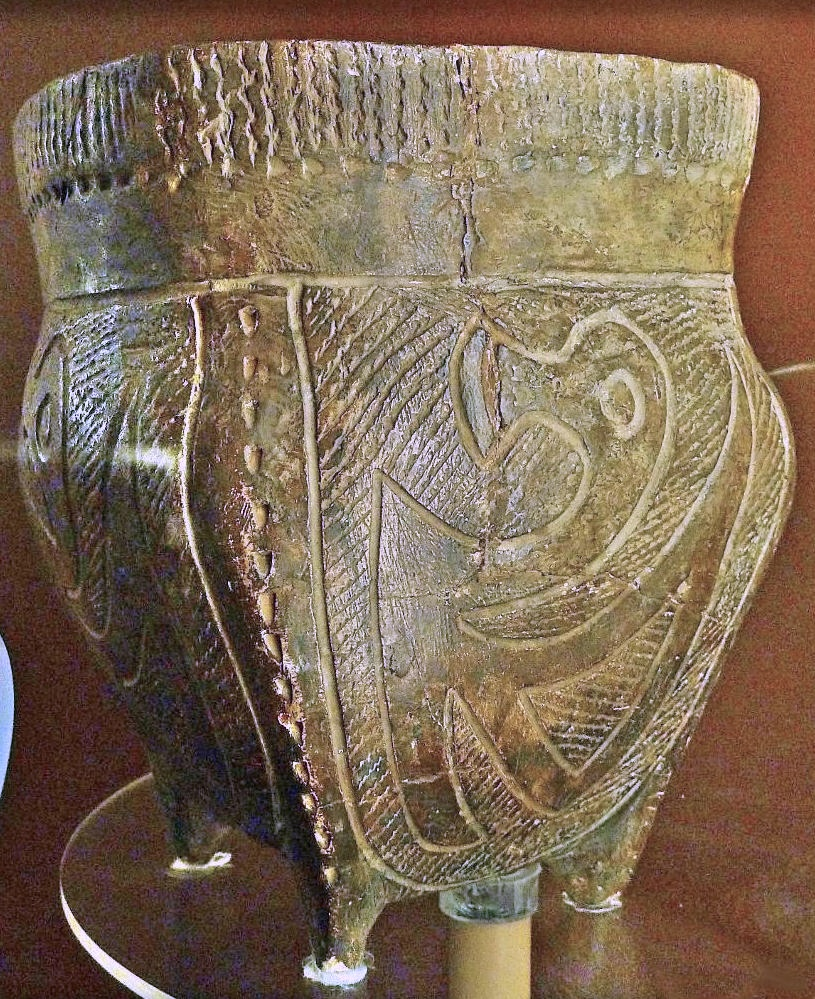
Pot with a bird design, Hopewell site

== Local expressions of Hopewellian traditions ==
In addition to the noted Ohio Hopewell, a number of other Middle Woodland period cultures are known to have been involved in the Hopewell tradition and participated in the Hopewell exchange network.

=== Armstrong culture ===
The Armstrong culture was a Hopewell group in the Big Sandy River Valley of northeastern Kentucky and western West Virginia from 1 to 500 CE. They are thought to have been a regional variant of the Hopewell tradition or a Hopewell-influenced Middle Woodland group who had peacefully mingled with the local Adena peoples. Archaeologist Edward McMichael characterized them as an intrusive Hopewell-like trade culture or a vanguard of Hopewellian tradition that had probably peacefully absorbed the local Adena in the Kanawha River Valley. Their culture and very Late Adena (46PU2) is thought to have slowly evolved into the later Buck Garden people.

=== Copena culture ===
The Copena culture was a Hopewellian culture in northern Alabama, Mississippi, and Tennessee, as well as in other sections of the surrounding region including Kentucky. Researchers developed the Copena name based on the first three letters of copper and the last three letters of the mineral galena, as copper and galena artifacts have often been found with Copena burials.

=== Crab Orchard culture ===
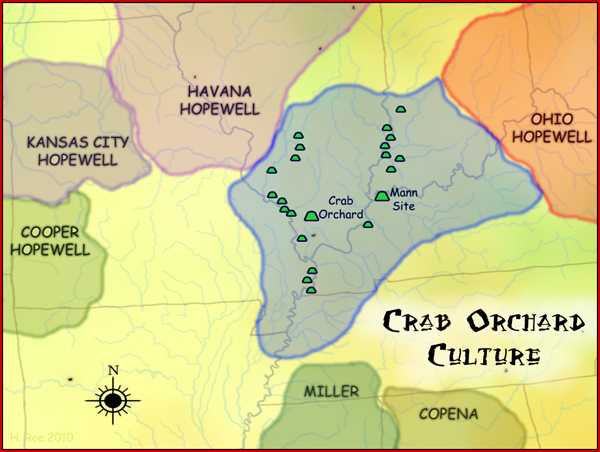
Crab Orchard culture

During the Middle Woodland period, the Crab Orchard culture population increased from a dispersed and sparsely settled Early Woodland pattern to one consisting of small and large base camps. These were concentrated on terrace and floodplain landforms associated with the Ohio River channel in southern Indiana, southern Illinois, and northwestern and western Kentucky. In the far western limits of Crab Orchard culture is the O'byams Fort site. This large earthwork, shaped like a tuning fork, is reminiscent of Ohio Hopewell enclosures. Examples of a type of pottery decoration found at the Mann site are also known from Hopewell sites in Ohio (such as Seip earthworks, Rockhold, Harness, and Turner), as well as from Southeastern sites with Hopewellian assemblages, such as the Miner's Creek site, Leake Mounds, 9HY98, and Mandeville site in Georgia, and the Yearwood site in southern Tennessee. The variant of Crab Orchard found at Kincaid_Mounds_State_Historic_Site and nearby in the Lower Ohio Valley in known as the Baumer culture.

=== Goodall focus ===
The Goodall focus culture occupied Michigan and northern Indiana from around 200 BCE to 500 CE. The Goodall pattern stretched from the southern tip of Lake Michigan, east across northern Indiana, to the Ohio border, then northward, covering central Michigan, almost reaching to Saginaw Bay on the east and Grand Traverse Bay to the north. The culture is named for the Goodall site in northwest Indiana.

=== Havana Hopewell culture ===
The Havana Hopewell culture was a Hopewellian people in the Illinois and Mississippi river valleys in Iowa, Illinois, and Missouri. They are considered ancestral to the groups who eventually formed the Mississippian culture that built Cahokia (in present-day southwestern Illinois) and influenced the hinterlands of the Mississippi and Ohio rivers, including into the Appalachian Mountains.

The Toolesboro site is a group of seven burial mounds on a bluff overlooking the Iowa River near its confluence with the Mississippi River. The conical mounds were constructed between 100 BCE and 200 CE. At one time, as many as 12 mounds may have existed. Mound 2, the largest remaining, measures 100 ft (30 m) in diameter and 8 ft (2.4 m) in height. This mound was possibly the largest Hopewell mound in Iowa.

=== Kansas City Hopewell ===
At the western edge of the Hopewell interaction sphere is the Kansas City Hopewell. The Renner Village archeological site in Riverside, Missouri, is one of several sites near the junction of Line Creek and the Missouri River. The site contains Hopewell and succeeding Middle Mississippian remains. The Trowbridge archeological site near Kansas City is close to the western limit of the Hopewell. "Hopewell-style" pottery and stone tools, typical of the Illinois and Ohio River valleys, are abundant at the Trowbridge site. Decorated Hopewell-style pottery rarely appears further west.

The Cloverdale site is situated at the mouth of a small valley that opens into the Missouri River Valley, near present-day Saint Joseph, Missouri. It is a multi-component site with evidence of Kansas City Hopewell (around 100 to 500 CE) and Steed-Kisker (around 1200 CE) occupation.

=== Laurel complex ===
The Laurel complex was a Native American culture in what is now southern Quebec, southern and northwestern Ontario, and east-central Manitoba in Canada; and northern Michigan, northwestern Wisconsin, and northern Minnesota in the United States. They were the first pottery-using people of Ontario north of the Trent-Severn Waterway. The complex is named after the former unincorporated community of Laurel, Minnesota.

=== Marksville culture ===
The Marksville culture was a Hopewellian culture in the Lower Mississippi valley, Yazoo valley, and Tensas valley areas of present-day Louisiana, Mississippi, Missouri, and Arkansas. It evolved into the Baytown culture and later the Coles Creek and Plum Bayou cultures. It is named for the Marksville Prehistoric Indian Site in Marksville, Louisiana.

=== Miller culture ===
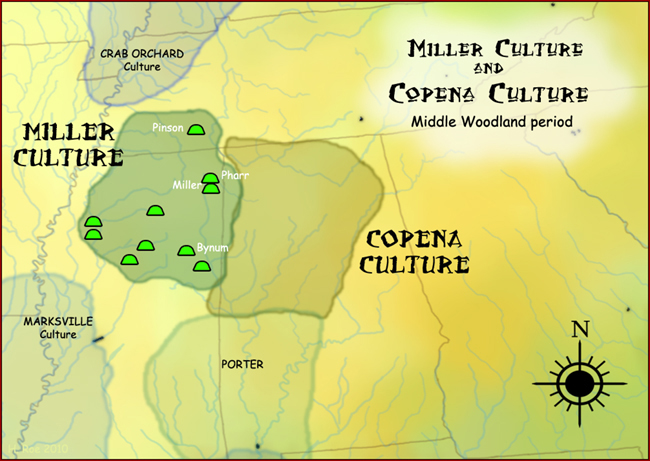
Miller and Copena cultures

The Miller culture was a Hopewellian culture located in the upper Tombigbee River drainage areas of southwestern Tennessee, northeastern Mississippi, and west-central Alabama, best known from excavations at the Pinson Mounds, Bynum Mounds, Miller (type site), and Pharr Mounds sites. The culture is divided chronologically into two phases, Miller 1 and Miller 2, with a later Miller 3 belonging to the Late Woodland period. Some sites associated with the Miller culture, such as Ingomar Mound and Pinson Mounds on its western periphery, built large platform mounds. Archaeologist speculate the mounds were for feasting rituals. With that purpose, they fundamentally differed from later Mississippian culture platform mounds, which were mortuary and substructure platforms. By the end of the Late Woodland period, about 1000 CE, the Miller culture area was absorbed into the succeeding Mississippian culture.

=== Montane Hopewell ===
The Montane Hopewell on the Tygart Valley area, an upper branch of the Monongahela River of northern West Virginia, is similar to Armstrong. The pottery and cultural characteristics are also similar to late Ohio Hopewell. They occurred during the neighboring Watson through Buck Garden periods of peoples to the south and westerly in the state. Montane Hopewell is a variant that is a considerable distance from Cole Culture and Peters Phase, or Hopewell central Ohio. According to McMichael, the culture built small, conical mounds in the late Hopewell period; this religion appeared to be waning in terms of being expressed in the daily living activities at these sites. The influence of an elite priest cult, burial phase was centered toward the Midwest states and was less important here.

=== Ohio Hopewell culture ===
Preceded by Adena culture	Ohio Hopewell; 200 BCE-500 CE	Succeeded by Fort Ancient

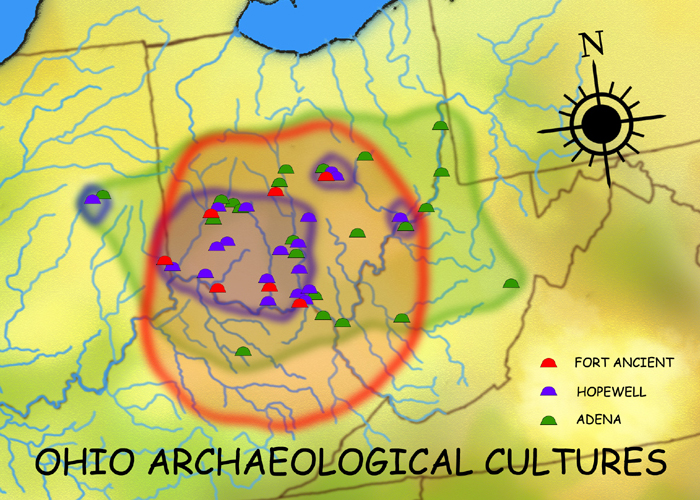
Map of the archaeological cultures of Ohio

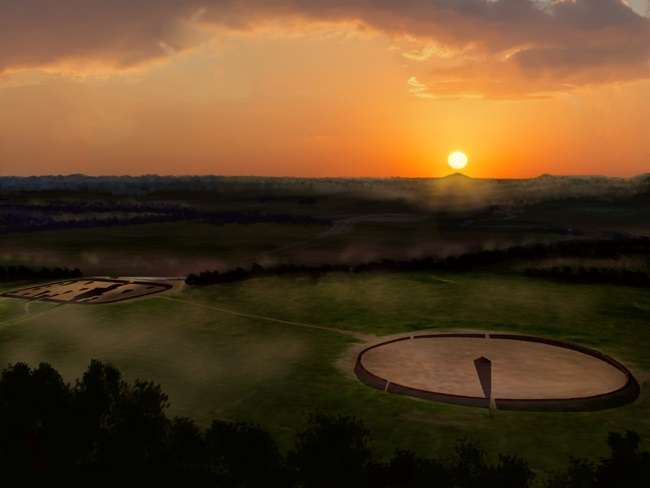
Artists conception of the summer solstice sunrise at the Shriver Circle with the Mound City Group to the left

The greatest concentration of Hopewell ceremonial sites is in the Scioto River Valley (from Columbus to Portsmouth, Ohio) and adjacent Paint Creek valley, centered on Chillicothe, Ohio. These cultural centers typically contained a burial mound and a geometric earthwork complex that covers ten to hundreds of acres, with sparse residential settlements. There is little evidence of large resident populations at the monument complexes.

The Hopewell Culture National Historical Park, encompassing mounds for which the culture is named, is in the Paint Creek Valley just a few miles from Chillicothe, Ohio. Other earthworks in the Chillicothe area include Hopeton, Mound City, Seip Earthworks and Dill Mounds District, High Banks Works, Liberty, Cedar-Bank Works, Anderson, Frankfort, Dunlap, Spruce Hill, Story Mound, and Shriver Circle. When colonial settlers first crossed the Appalachians, after almost a century and a half in North America, they were astounded at these monumental constructions, some as high as 70 feet (21 m) and covering acres.

The Ohio Hopewell may have made pilgrimages to Obsidian Cliff in what is today Yellowstone National Park, a journey which would have required walking 2,000 miles (3,200 kilometers) each way. Grave goods at Mound City include hundreds of pounds of obsidian traceable to Yellowstone as well as copper shaped to resemble the horns of bighorn sheep native to the Rockies.

The Portsmouth Earthworks were constructed from 100 BCE to 500 CE. It is a large ceremonial center located at the confluence of the Scioto and Ohio rivers. Part of this earthwork complex extends across the Ohio River into Kentucky. The earthworks included a northern section consisting of a number of circular enclosures, two large, horseshoe-shaped enclosures, and three sets of parallel-walled roads leading away from this location. One set of walls went to the southwest and may have linked to a large square enclosure located on the Kentucky side of the Ohio River. Another set of walls led to the southeast, where it crossed the Ohio River and continued to the Biggs site, a complicated circular enclosure surrounding a conical mound. The third set of walls went to the northwest for an undetermined distance, in the direction of the Tremper site.

=== Point Peninsula complex ===
The Point Peninsula complex was a Native American culture located in present-day Ontario, Canada and New York, United States, during the Middle Woodland period. It is thought to have been influenced by the Hopewell traditions of the Ohio River valley. This influence seems to have ended about 250 CE, after which burial ceremonialism was no longer practiced.

=== Saugeen complex ===
The Saugeen complex was a Native American culture located around the southeast shores of Lake Huron and the Bruce Peninsula, around the London, Ontario area, and possibly as far east as the Grand River in Canada. Some evidence exists that the Saugeen complex people of the Bruce Peninsula may have evolved into the historic Odawa people, also known as the Ottawa.

=== Swift Creek culture ===
The Swift Creek culture was a Middle Woodland period archaeological culture in the southeast of the United States (present-day Georgia, Alabama, Florida, South Carolina, and Tennessee) dating to around 100–700 CE.

=== Wilhelm culture ===
The Wilhelm culture (1 to 500 CE), Hopewellian influenced, appeared in the Northern Panhandle of West Virginia. They were contemporaneous to Armstrong central in the Big Sandy valley, nearly 200 miles downstream on the Ohio River. They were surrounded by peoples who made Watson-styled pottery, with a Z-twist cordage finished surface. Wilhelm pottery was similar to Armstrong pottery, but not as well made. Pipe fragments appear to be the platform-base type.

Small earthwork mounds were built around individual burials in stone-lined graves (cists). These were covered over together under a single large mound.

Little studied are their four reported village sites, which appear to have been abandoned by about 500 CE. As of 2009, new local researchers are looking at this area period and may provide future insight.

== Cultural decline ==
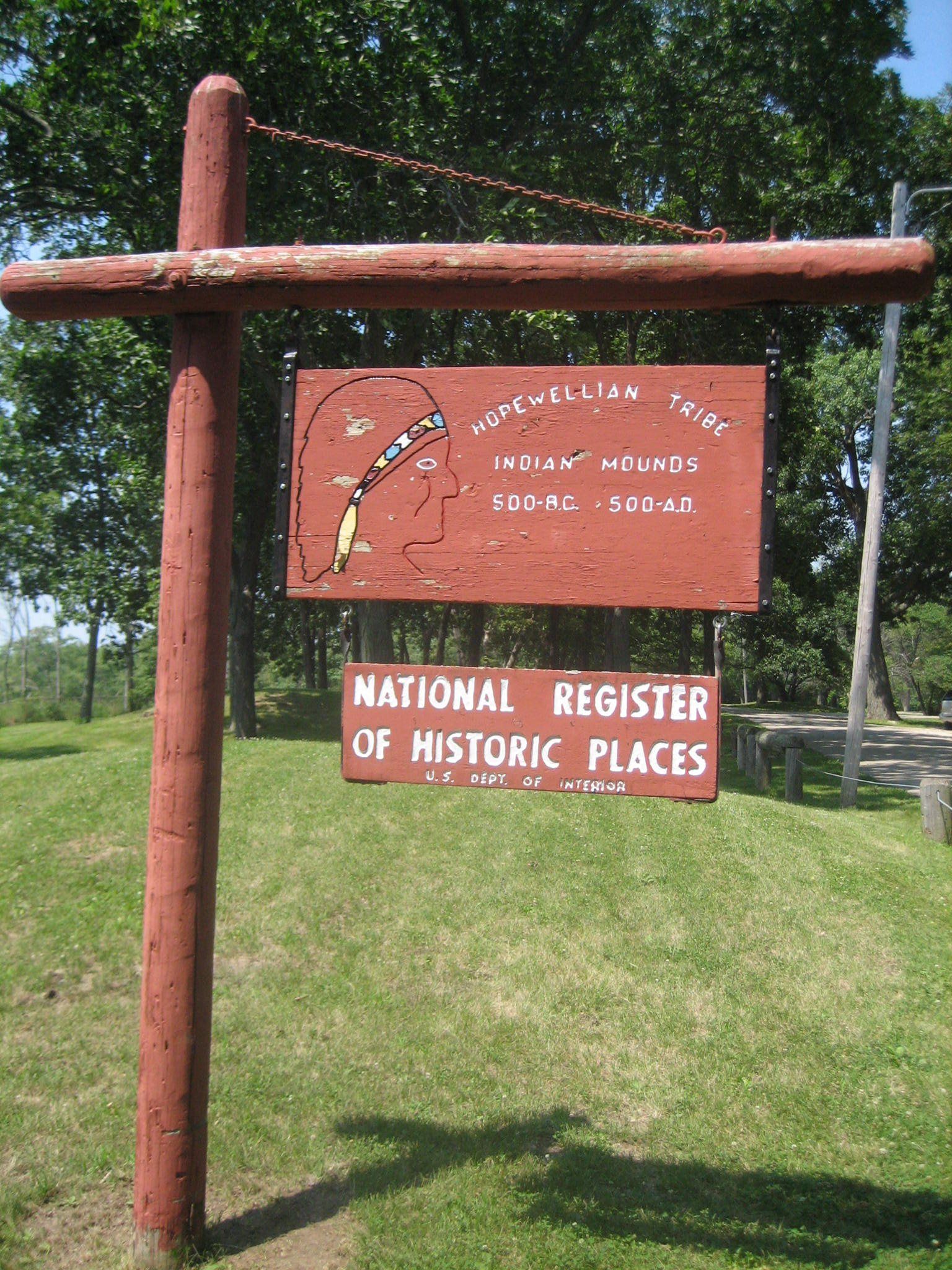
Sinnissippi Mounds, Sinnissippi Park, Sterling, Illinois

Around 500 CE, the Hopewell exchange ceased, mound building stopped, and characteristic art forms were no longer produced. War is a possible cause, as villages dating to the Late Woodland period shifted to larger communities protected by palisade walls and ditches. Colder climatic conditions could have driven game animals north or west in search of grazing land. The introduction of the bow and arrow may have led to over-hunting of game populations and made warfare more deadly. With fewer people using trade routes, the transmission of traditions may have dwindled. The breakdown in social organization could also have resulted from adoption of full-scale agriculture. Conclusive reasons for the dispersal of the people have not yet been determined.

Preceded by Early Woodland period Adena culture	Hopewell tradition 200 BCE – 500 CE	Succeeded by Late Woodland

== See also ==
- Hopewell Ceremonial Earthworks - World Heritage Site preserving Ohio Hopewell sites
- List of Hopewell sites
- Adena culture
