= Line Creek (Missouri) =

Stream in Platte County, Missouri, U.S.

Coordinates: 39°09′37″N 94°37′03″W

Line Creek is a stream in Platte County in the U.S. state of Missouri. It is a tributary of the Missouri River.

Line Creek was named for the fact its course flows parallel to the Clay—Platte county line.

== Course ==
The stream headwaters in the Barry Harbour, Kansas City neighborhood, and flows southward through Kansas City, Northmoor, and Riverside before depositing in the Missouri River. The reservoirs of Lake Waukomis, and Houston Lake both join this stream. Argosy Casino Riverside is situated on the west side of the stream's confluence with the Missouri River.

== Tributaries ==
There are four named tributaries of Line Creek: East Fork, Old Maids Creek, East Creek, and Jumping Branch.
