= Adams County Paleo-Indian District =

Archaeological site in Ohio, United States

- U.S. National Register of Historic Places
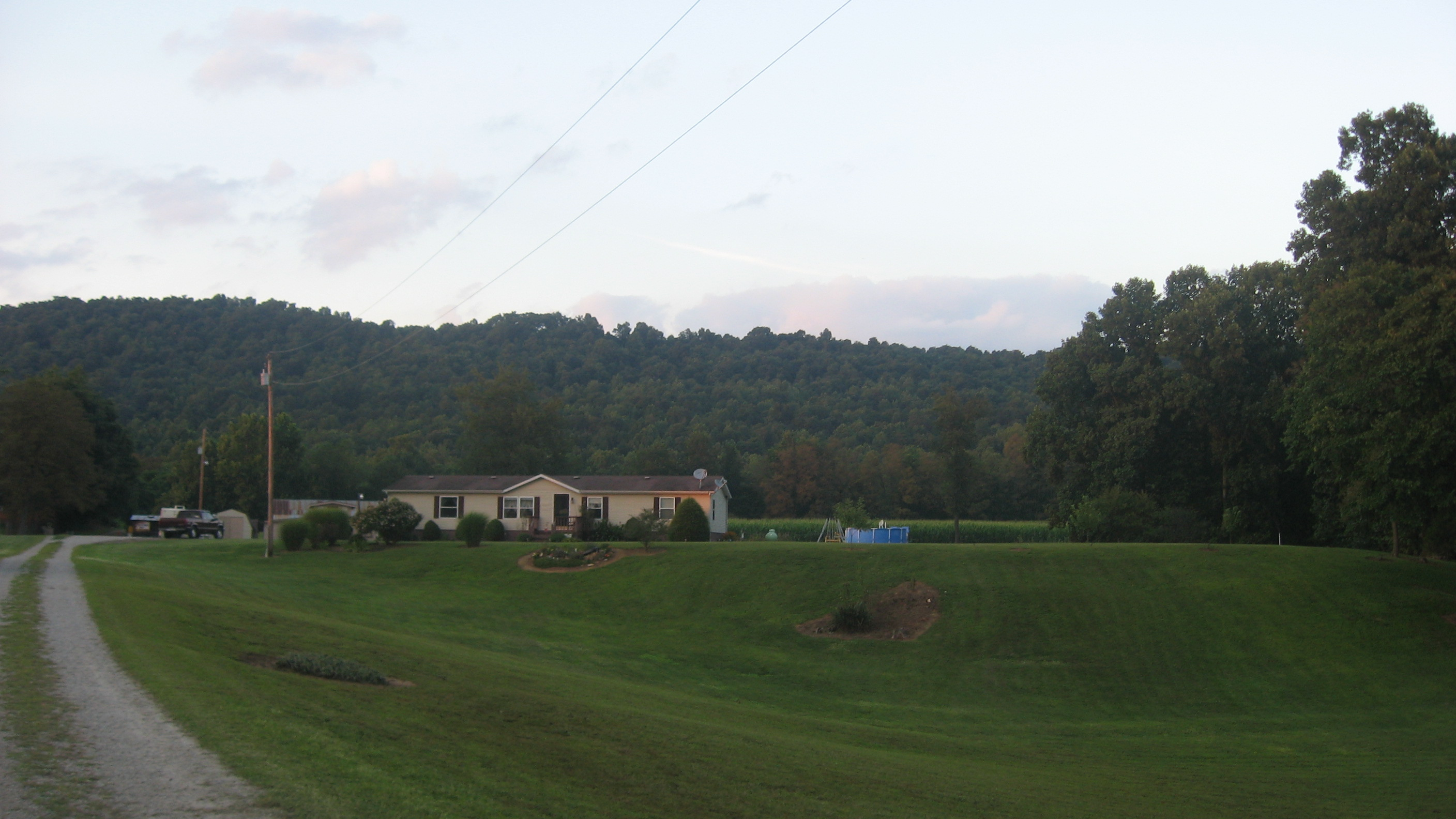
- View from the south

- Location within Ohio Location within the United States
- Location: North of U.S. Route 52 near Sandy Springs, Ohio
- Coordinates: 38°36′48″N 83°17′39″W
- Area: 175 acres (71 ha)
- NRHP reference No.: 74001389
- Added to NRHP: October 17, 1974

The Adams County Paleo-Indian District is an archaeological site near Sandy Springs in Green Township, Adams County, Ohio, United States.

== Excavation ==
Approximately 10,000 years BP, the site was repeatedly occupied by groups of Paleo-Indians, who took advantage of its location near salt springs to hunt local wildlife. Artifacts found at the site are concentrated in multiple small middens that are believed to represent individual campsites. Among these artifacts are gravers, scrapers, and projectile points.

Within a few years of the site's discovery, a 1982 report noted that it had yielded more than seventy fluted points (elsewhere identified as Clovis points), which the report's authors declared made it an example of "unusual size and complexity". Other researchers have designated them as Gainey Points. Such large sites as Adams County, or "Sandy Springs" as it is also known, are rare among Paleo-Indian sites; most discoveries related to the people are isolated finds, although a comparable archaeological district known as the Welling site has been discovered in Coshocton County, Ohio. It appears that southern Adams County was highly significant for such primitive peoples because of its geology: one of Ohio's few regions with combined shale and limestone bedrock, the Sandy Springs area is geologically similar to the Kentucky Bluegrass, making it a natural migration route for herds of animals roaming the Bluegrass. As a result, Paleo-Indian hunters learned to use the area to watch for and ambush large herds of animals, which would have been travelling slowly due to the large river.

== Recognition ==
The Adams County Paleo-Indian Archeological District is particularly valuable as a well-preserved example of the Paleo-Indian period. It is believed that the portion of the site that has been excavated is smaller than the portion that has not yet been excavated. In recognition of its archaeological significance, the site was placed on the National Register of Historic Places in 1974. Approximately 175 acres (71 ha) is included in the landmarked area.

== See also ==
- Paleo Crossing site
