= Sheriden Cave =

Ice age archaeological site in Ohio, US

- Location within Ohio
- 40°58′50.64″N 83°26′41.22″W
- Location: Ridge Township, Wyandot County, Ohio, US

Sheriden Cave is a Paleo-Indian archaeological site from the late Ice age in Wyandot County, Ohio, United States. Glacial deposits sealed off the cave more than 10,000 years ago. Sheriden Cave is a karst sinkhole on a dolomite ridge that crosses Hancock and Wyandot Counties. It is associated with the Indian Trail Caverns that opened in 1927. Sheriden Cave was discovered in 1989. The cave is unique because in addition to stone tools, there were also bone tools, remains of extinct animals, and organic matter found in the cave. Radiocarbon dating of artifacts indicate that they were used 11,000 and 12,000 years ago.

== Excavation ==
By 1995, the opening to the cave was exposed by a bulldozer. There was an initial study of the site due to the paleontological remains, but a 1995 discovery found evidence of human occupation of the cave. Kenneth Tankersley of Kent State University led the excavation of the site, with his colleagues and the support of the National Science Foundation, beginning about 1997 and for about three years.

== Findings ==
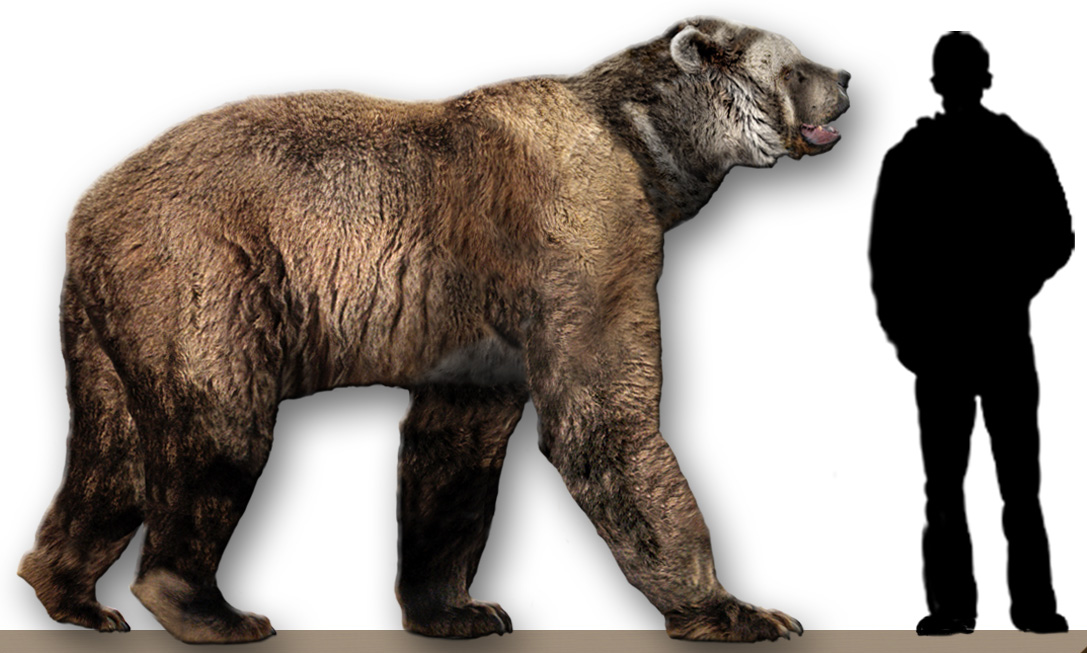
Arctodus simus, a short-faced bear, compared to a human

Rare bone spear points, a flint hide-scraper, and a fluted spear point were found in the cave, radiocarbon dated to 11,000 and 12,000 years ago. The artifacts found include Clovis culture material.

Along with the artifacts were remains of the now-extinct Late Pleistocene epoch animals, including the giant short-faced bear, stag moose, flat-headed peccary, and the giant beaver. The material in the cave was well-preserved, with organic material like gourds and human feces. There was also a layer of wood charcoal. Because well-preserved material from the Paleo-Indian period is unique in the eastern United States, little is known about how Paleo-Indians lived. This site is important to understanding how early humans lived in Ohio and how that compares to other early people who crossed the Bering Strait to enter the Americas.

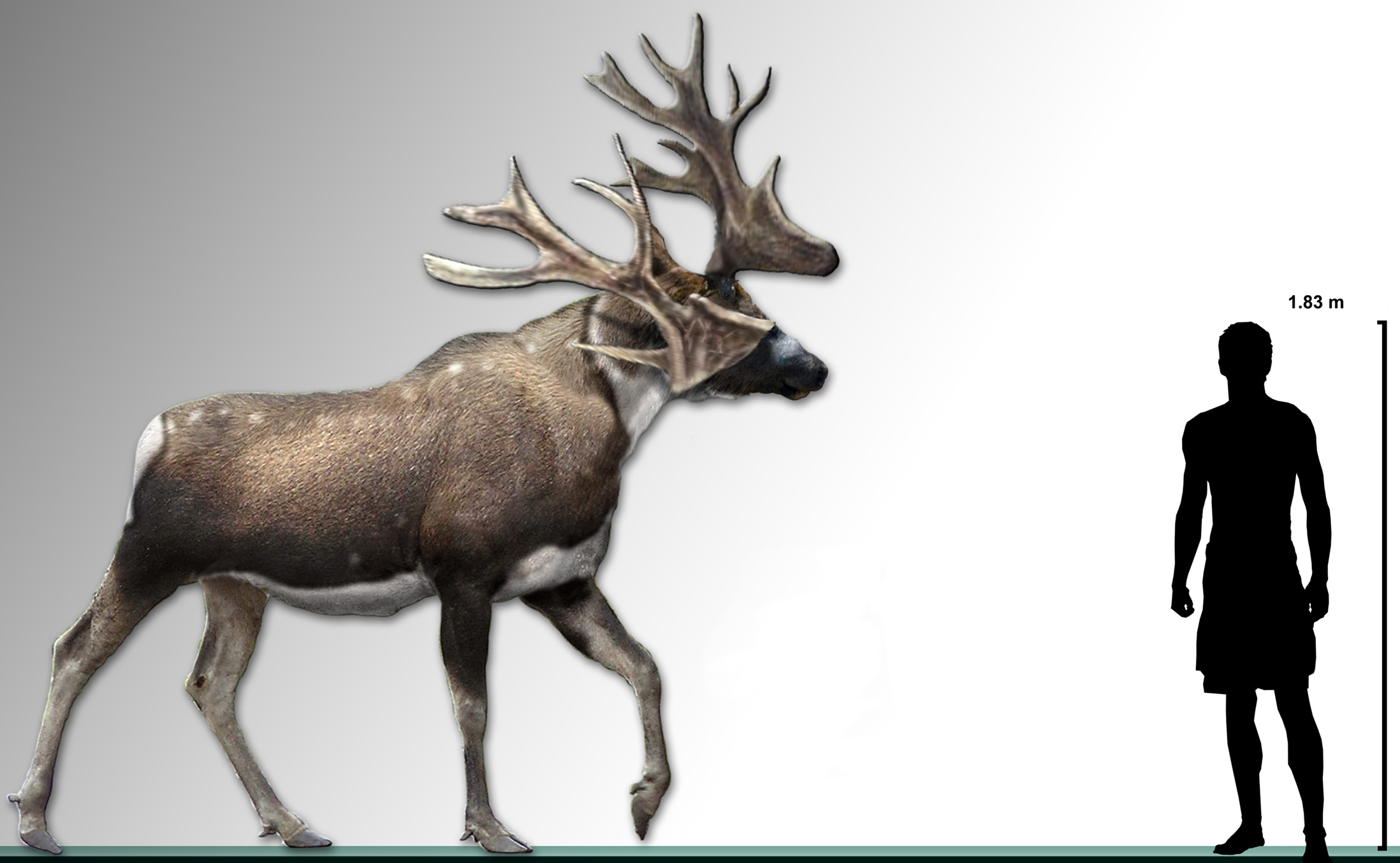
Cervalces scotti size chart

Kent State University archaeology professor Ken Tankersley found that people occupied the cave about 11,500 years ago, at a time where there was significant climate and environmental change. A historic marker marks the area near the cave, where the entrance is fenced off.

Other Paleo-Indian sites in Ohio include Paleo Crossing site in Medina County, Nobles Pond site in Stark County, and the Welling site in Coshocton County.
