= Sandy Springs (disambiguation) =

Sandy Springs is a city in the U.S. state of Georgia.

Sandy Springs or Sandy Spring may also refer to:

- Sandy Springs, Ohio, an unincorporated community
- Sandy Springs, South Carolina
- Sandy Springs (MARTA station), an underground metro station on the MARTA system in Atlanta
- Ashton-Sandy Spring, Maryland, a census-designated place (CDP) in Montgomery County, Maryland
- Sandy Spring, Maryland

== See also ==
- Sandy Spring Bank, a community bank serving Maryland and Virginia
- Sandy Spring Friends School, a Quaker school in Sandy Spring, Maryland
- Sandy Springs Middle School
- Sandy Springs Park, a public park in Maryville, Tennessee
