= Whittlesey culture =

Whittlesey culture is an archaeological designation for a Native American people, who lived in northeastern Ohio during the Late Precontact and Early Contact period between A.D. 1000 to 1640. By 1500, they flourished as an agrarian society that grew maize, beans, and squash. After European contact, their population decreased due to disease, malnutrition, and warfare. There was a period of long, cold winters that would have impacted their success cultivating food from about 1500.

The Whittlesey culture people created a distinctive style of pottery and built defensive villages, set high on promontories with steep cliffs and surrounded by ditches or stockades. Their villages were on the Lake Erie plain or overlooking rivers and streams. About 1640, Whittlesey villages were abandoned and due to the displacement of Native groups during the early contact period with Europeans, it is not known where or how they relocated.

South Park Village, a Whittlesey culture site in Cuyahoga County, is listed on the National Register of Historic Places. A historic marker about the Whittlesey people is located on Seeley Road in LeRoy Township, Lake County, Ohio.

== Charles Whittlesey ==
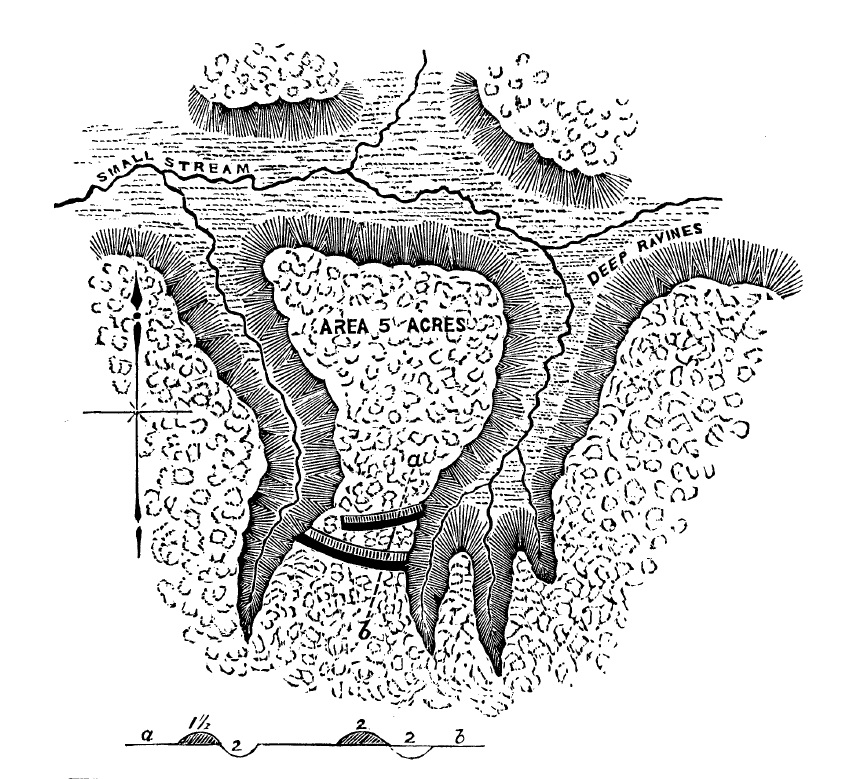
A semi-permanent encampment of the Woodland people or the Whittlesey culture, located about the modern intersection of Broadway Avenue and Aetna Road in Cleveland, Ohio, in the United States. Drawn by Charles Whittlesey, 1867

The culture is named for Charles Whittlesey, an archaeologist and geologist who was the founder of the Western Reserve Historical Society. He was known for his work discovering and describing indigenous people, the Whittlesey culture, who lived in northeast Ohio from A.D. 1000 to 1600.

== Culture ==
The Whittlesey people are known for where and how they established villages and their pottery. Their villages were surrounded by ditches or palisades and were located near the Lake Erie coast or on plateaus in river valleys. They did not have a complex trade network.

=== Economy ===
From A.D. 1200 to 1350, people of the Whittlesey culture were primarily hunter-gatherers who cultivated crops a bit and fished. They grew into a more agrarian culture between A.D. 1350 to 1500. Different varieties of maize and beans were cultivated. The greater the population, the greater the likelihood that people from a given site would live an agrarian lifestyle. The culture's final phase, beginning about 1500, shows that people no longer ranged for food; They were an agrarian society, growing beans, squash, and maize.

=== Lodging ===
Groups of three or four families lived in small settlements along rivers between the spring and fall seasons. They established hunting camps during the winter. They lived near secondary stream mouths on low terraces in larger settlements. They lived on protected promontories by 1400. Lodging evolved over time from simple wigwams to square houses with wall posts of 400 square feet. In the autumn and winter, camps were established on the lake plain. They became more dispersed and smaller. Starting about 1500, they lived in villages designed for defense and lived in long houses with multiple families. There was also a sweat lodge in one village in a ceremonial pit house. Many of the Whittlesey sites have not been preserved from this period, but there are villages on promontories along the Cuyahoga Valley. They are located about eight miles from their neighboring villages and are located on steep bluffs with protective ditches and walls.

=== Ceramics ===
Grit, and sometimes also shell, was used to temper pottery made in the Late Whittlesey period. Both simple stamped rounded pottery and fine cord-marked and smoothed pottery was made at that time. They had various ways of decorating and finishing necks, lips, and handles of their pottery. Of their pottery resembled that of Wellsburg culture sites in the Upper Ohio river valley. and Ricker ceramics in the Tuscarawas River valley from the 15th century.

=== Artifacts ===
Stemmed knives, small triangular projectile points, and flake scrapers are the few types of tools found from the Early Whittlesey period.

=== Burial ===
Their dead were buried at first in observance of simple burial rites. After 1350, family members were buried in larger graves and, depending upon the group, ornamental goods were buried with some of the dead. Later in the culture, people were buried in cemeteries outside of the settlement in graves. Group cemeteries were generally found near the hunting and fishing camps by 1400.

=== Decline ===
The population of people in the Whittlesey settlements declined from 1400 until 1640 when they finally disappeared in northeastern Ohio. Longer and colder winters between 1500 and 1640 likely made cultivating crops difficult. Over that period, people were more tightly concentrated in villages. The remains of some of the people identifies deaths due to disease, nutritional deficiency, and traumatic injury, including charred and butchered human bones. This indicates that there was war, torture, and some instances of cannibalism. When this occurred, there were small campsites located near the large villages.

People from the Whittlesey tradition and Fort Ancient culture of Ohio and Pennsylvania may have been ancestors of the Erie people, who were ultimately "destroyed as a group in northeastern Ohio" in 1654 by invading Haudenosaunee peoples from New York.

The Whittlesey lifestyle was similar to that of the Shawnee, but their settlement pattern was similar to the Haudenosaunee. The Whittlesey did not engage in the fur trade with European traders during the early contact period. Whittlesey sites were abandoned about 1640 and were not populated again until the mid-1740s when Odawa and Wyandot people from Detroit moved into the area. Due to the degree of displacement of Native groups during the early contact period, it is difficult to ascertain what happened to the Whittlesey culture people.

== Sites ==
=== South Park Village ===
- South Park Site
- U.S. National Register of Historic Places
- Location within Ohio Location within the United States
- Location: on a promontory above the western bank of the Cuyahoga River near Independence, Cuyahoga County, Ohio
- Coordinates: 41°23′8.13″N 81°37′13.04″W
- NRHP reference No.: 76000212
- Added to NRHP: June 22, 1976

The Whittlesey established a permanent village across from the Cuyahoga River and lived there for hundreds of years. Artifacts include arrowheads and decorated pottery. They did not have a complex trade network. Their diet included a combination of foods that were hunted and gathered. They hunted duck, beaver, and deer. River mollusks, walnuts, grapes, hickory nuts, and chokeberries were part of their diet.

The site is located on a promontory above the western bank of the Cuyahoga River near Independence, Cuyahoga County, Ohio and seven miles from Lake Erie. It was listed with the National Register of Historic Places on June 22, 1976. A historic marker is located on the Towpath Trail in Valley View, Ohio.

=== Outdoor Education Center Site ===
The Outdoor Education Center (OEC 1 Site), a Independence Board of Education building, is also an archaeological site of prehistoric people of the Whittlesey culture and earlier. It is located in Independence, Ohio in a wooden nature preserve along the Cuyahoga River. Animal bones, Madison point stone tools, and Tuttle Hill decorated pottery sherds were attributed to the Whittlesey culture. The excavated items were found over a dispersed area in 1999 by a group led by Mark Kollecker, Supervisor of Archaeology Field Programs of the Cleveland Museum of Natural History. From the several excavations, the village sat on two to four acres.

Kollecker led another Archaeology Field Experience program group in April and May 2000 and found several post molds and nine cooking and storage pits of prehistoric people. A Leimbach cord-marked vessel from about 500 B.C. is believed to be from the Early Woodland period, long before the Whittlesey culture would have lived at the site. Brian G. Redmond led another group during the summer, where more post molds, storage pits, and trash pits were found. One of the storage pits was a large hold for maize 1.66 by 1.56 metres (5.4 by 5.1 ft), diameter and depth, respectively. They also found cooking features, many stone tools and pottery, and a partially subterranean sweat lodge. Animals butchered at the site include small game animals, raccoon, wild turkey, elk and deer. They fished for freshwater mollusk and fish in the Cuyahoga River. Two artifacts may have been used for ceremonial purposes. One was an engraved slate gorget, the other is the skull of a dog, which had been drilled with 14 symmetrically-placed holes, cut and ground.

=== Conneaut Works ===
Located on private land on the west side of Conneaut Creek in Ashtabula County, the site sits on private land. It featured a circular earthen wall atop high ground overlooking the creek. It was excavated in the 1970s and determinted to be an Erie site. A second village on the east side of the river featured a wooden palisade and may have actually been Erie, while Conneaut Works shows characteristics now known to be Whittlesey. Later, an Ottawa/ Mississauga camp was noted in the same general area, where Ottawas could access the resources of the Grand, Shenango and Mahoning River Valleys. They were forced to vacate the region by military command. Alleged burial mounds supposedly found in the same area were disproven.
