= Upper Mercer flint =

Type of flint

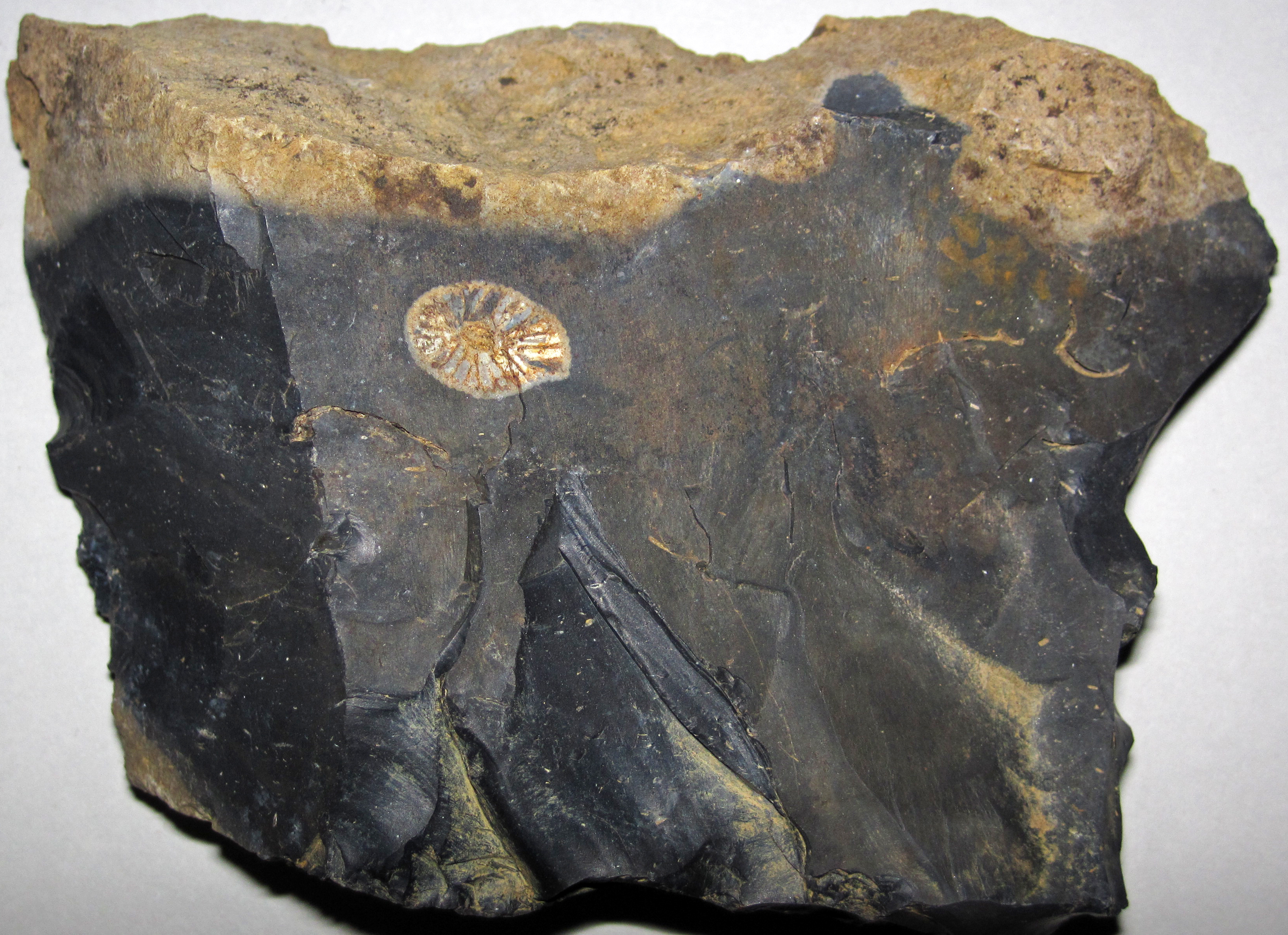
Upper Mercer flint, Nellie West Outcrop, Coshocton County, Ohio

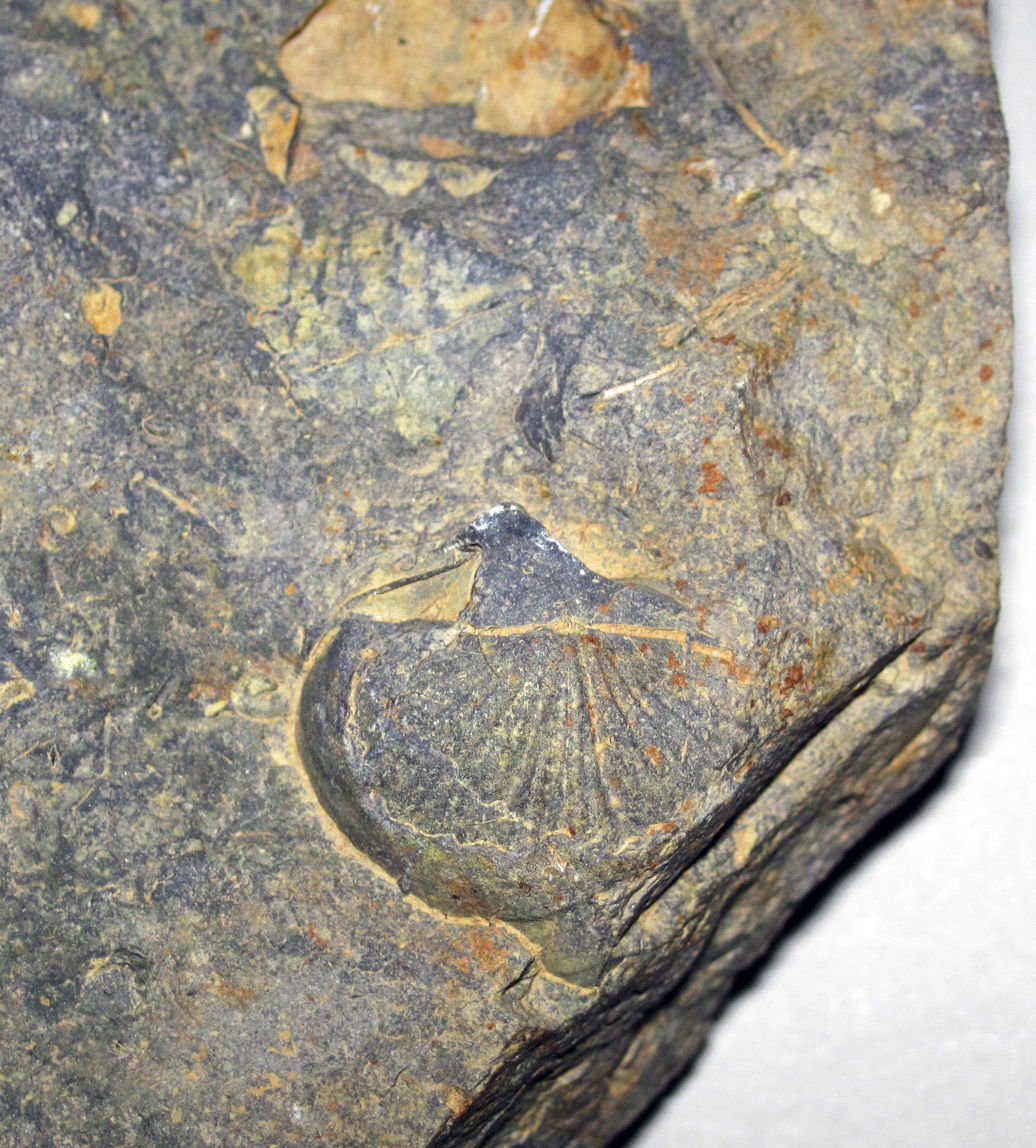
Weathered chert from the Upper Mercer flint, Nellie West Outcrop, Coshocton County, Ohio

Upper Mercer flint or Upper Mercer chert is a type of flint, or a pure form of chert, found in Coshocton, Hocking, and Perry counties of Ohio. Made of forms of silica and quartz, the hard and brittle stone was used by prehistoric people to make tools and weapons. To create stone tools, flint was heated to make chipping away at the stone easier, and then the flint was chipped to form razor-sharp edges. Resulting tools included spearheads, scrapers, knives, and arrows.

Ohio flint is found between layers of Cambridge Limestone and Brassfield Limestone. It was deposited during the Paleozoic Era in the seas that covered what is now Ohio. Other deposits can be found in soil moved by glaciers, in glacial till or as erratics.

The Welling site, an Upper Mercer flint quarry, is located on the eastern boundary of the town of Nellie in the Walhonding River Valley. It is 14 miles from the terminal moraine in the unglaciated Allegheny Plateau. The hills on either side of the valley are composed of bedrock of the Upper Mercer and Pottsville series.

The use of Upper Mercer flint by prehistoric people was first reported in 1945. The quality of the material used to make tools was important in the ability of prehistory and Native American people to thrive and they would travel hundreds of miles to quarry flint to create or replace tools. Tools made from Upper Mercer flint during the Paleo-Indian period were found in what is now Michigan and West Virginia. Tools made from Upper Mercer flint during the Archaic period has been found over multiple states including eastern Indiana, southern Michigan, southern Ontario, western Pennsylvania, and Ohio. It was used most extensively in north-central Ohio.

Early European settlers used to grind grain and used for flintlock guns, fire starters, and buhrstones. The state's official gemstone, it is used now for jewelry. Other quarries used by prehistoric people to gather flint in the state include Flint Ridge, a six mile deposit of Pennsylvanian-age Vanport flint that spanned western Muskingum and eastern Licking Counties, and Zaleski flint in Vinton and Jackson Counties.
