= Akron Fossils & Science Center =

Museum in Copley, Ohio

Coordinates: 41.082°N 81.644°W

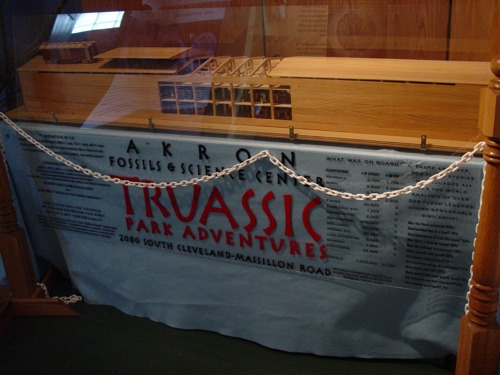
The Noah's Ark model, on display in the Creation Education Museum.

The Akron Fossils & Science Center is a small museum and learning center located in Copley Township, Ohio, United States, a few miles west of Akron. The building contains the Creation Education Museum, which features exhibits displaying the arguments for and against creationism and intelligent design, as well as an exploration of the relationship between science and the Bible. The building also houses several areas with interactive tour stations and activities focused on hands-on science. An outdoor park offers playground equipment and a 200 ft zip-line.

Throughout the year, the facility hosts a variety of educational programs. Some of the programming is targeted toward the religious base that supports the museum's creationist leanings, while many of the other programs maintain a straightforward, science-based approach. Activities like themed summer camps, presentations about fossilization, live animal shows, birthday parties, and Education Days take the more neutral approach. On the other hand, the center offers guided tours of the Creation Education Museum, as well as K-12 science classes, speaking engagements, and youth nights, all of which tend more towards the creationist approach. These programs are optional and are designed to promote pseudoscientific intelligent design theories in connection with the Judeo-Christian religious tradition.

== History ==
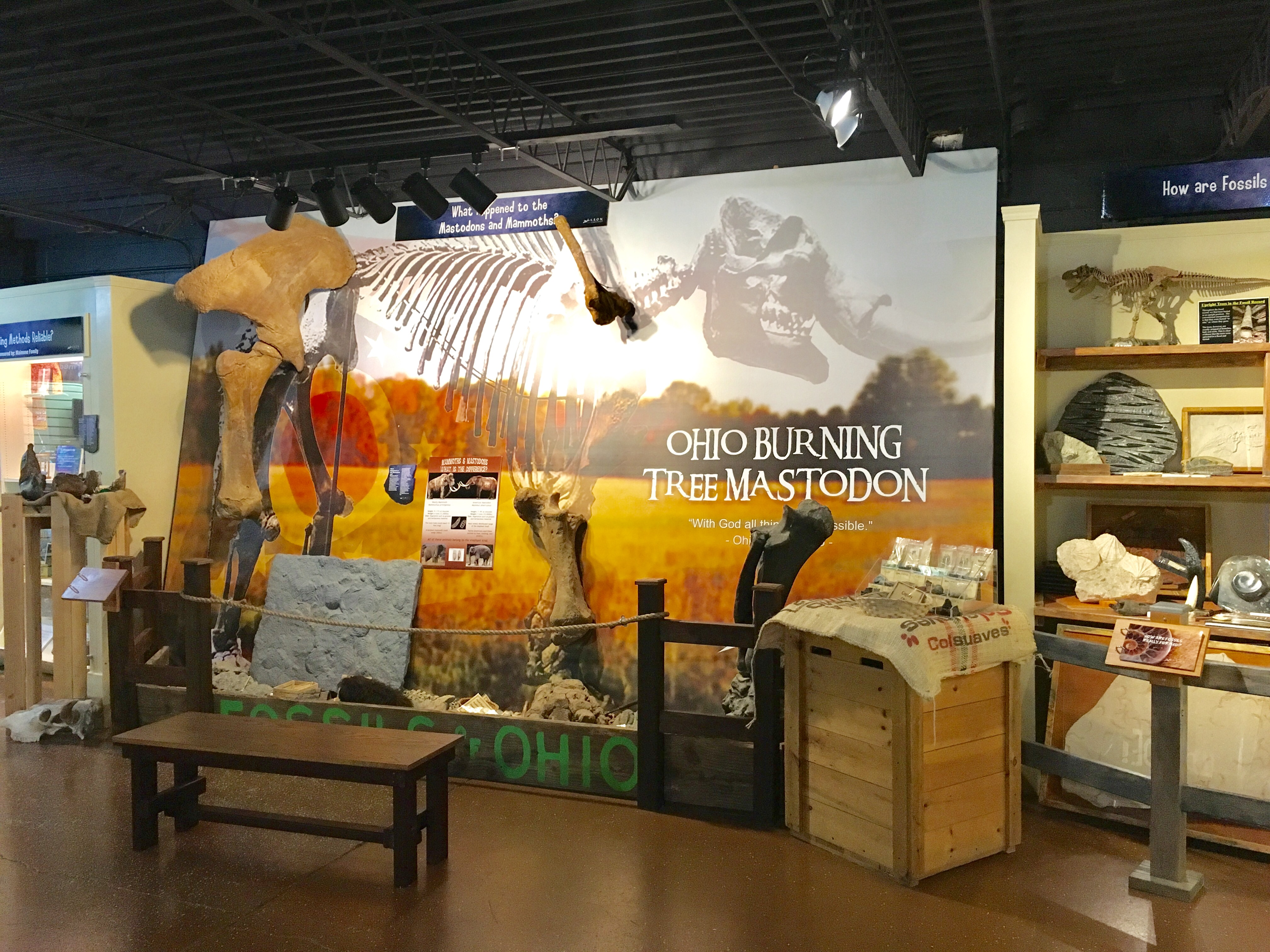
Burning Tree Mastodon exhibit at the Creation Education Museum

It was opened May 26, 2005, by William Sanderson II, a financial planner and former Cincinnati middle-school science teacher. Sanderson has an MBA from Malone University in Canton, Ohio, and a BSc degree in education from Miami University in Oxford, Ohio.

Since its opening, the facility has undergone several revisions and renovations to house its growing list of programming options. Fossilization presentations include hands-on experiences with dinosaur bones and eggs, permineralized teddy bears, and bivalve fossils, among other artifacts. Live animal interactions feature snakes, bearded dragons, guinea pigs, and sugar gliders.

Inside the Creation Education Museum, topics covered include abiogenesis, Mount St. Helens, the Grand Canyon, and the Ice Age. The museum also touches on several controversial subjects, including microevolution vs. macroevolution, Ica stones, OOPArts, dragons, intelligent design theory, Noah's flood, and several core tenets of creationism.

== Criticism ==
The scientific community considers creationism to be pseudoscience. As a result, science organizations, such as the National Center for Science Education, criticize the promotion of creationism as a form of non-science. Glenn Branch, deputy director of the NCSE explained "[The museum's] scientific claims are simply wrong and have been debunked long ago, and students who are misled by them are likely to be at a disadvantage as they study science at institutes of higher learning."
