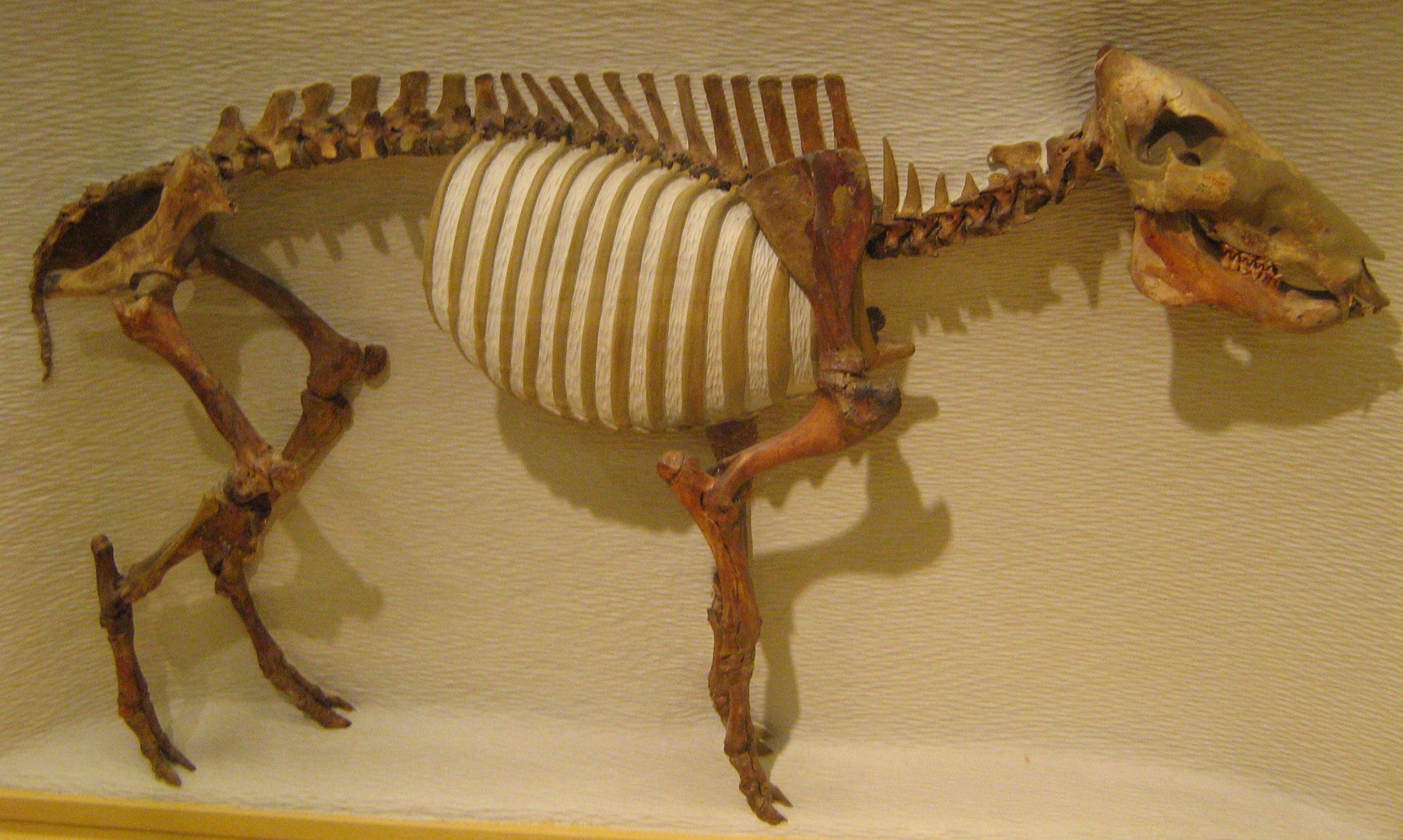
- Platygonus compressus skeleton

Scientific classification
- Kingdom: Animalia
- Phylum: Chordata
- Class: Mammalia
- Order: Artiodactyla
- Family: Tayassuidae
- Genus: †Platygonus
- Species: †P. compressus

Binomial name
- †Platygonus compressus Leconte, 1848

= Platygonus compressus =

Platygonus compressus Temporal range: Pleistocene

Extinct species of mammal

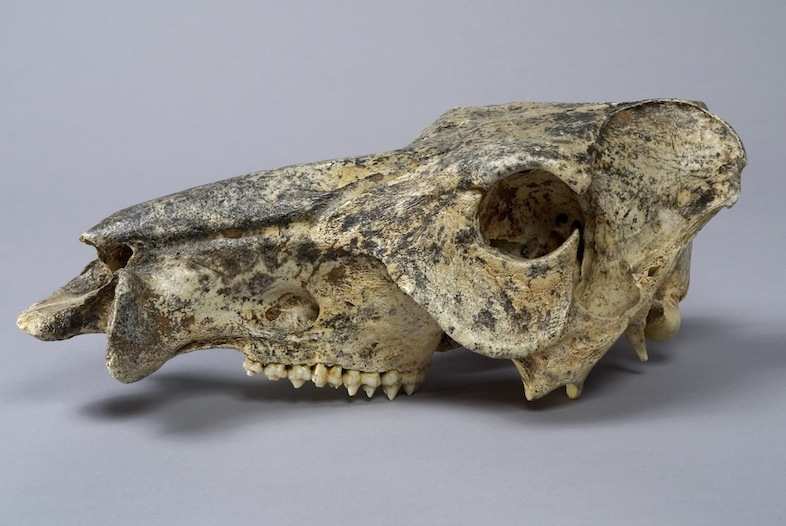
Platygonus compressus skull

Platygonus compressus, the flat-headed peccary, is an extinct mammal species from the Tayassuidae family that lived in North and South America during the Pleistocene. It was first described in 1848 by John L. Leconte.

== Description ==
The flat-headed peccary was about 75 cm (29.5 in) in shoulderheight and about 30 kg (66.1 lb) in weight. Other sources have estimated it to be similar in size to the wild boar. Sizes differ between the places they have been found.

Fossil skulls suggest a small brain, but a good sense of smell and sight. It has been suggested that the nasal cavity provided filtration for cold, dry and dusty air. Platygonus compressus had elongated limbs, a short humerus, broad and erect thoracic vertebrae and a large scapula. Therefore it has been suggested that this species may have been fleeter on foot than modern peccary species. Otherwise they probably appeared very similar to their closest living relative, the Chacoan peccary.

Genetic analysis conducted in 2017 indicates that the flat-headed peccary is a sister-taxon to a clade comprising extant peccary species, and divergence date estimates suggest that, if extant peccary diversification occurred in South America, then their common ancestor must have dispersed from North America to South America well before the establishment of the Isthmus of Panama, roughly three million years ago.

== Distribution and habitat ==
The flat-headed peccary was widespread throughout North America. Fossils have been found from what is now New York to California, Wisconsin to Mexico and further south in South America. An Individual has even been found as far north as the Yukon.

Platygonus compressus lived in a great variety of habitats and had a wide environmental climate tolerance. This species was known to have roamed North American boreal forests and tropical rainforests in South America.

Remains of the flat-headed peccary, along with Paleo-Indian artifacts and the remains of the giant short-faced bear, stag-moose, and the giant beaver were found in the Sheriden Cave in Wyandot County, Ohio.

Flat-headed peccary remains were found in Hastings Highlands, Ontario, along with remains of american mastodons.

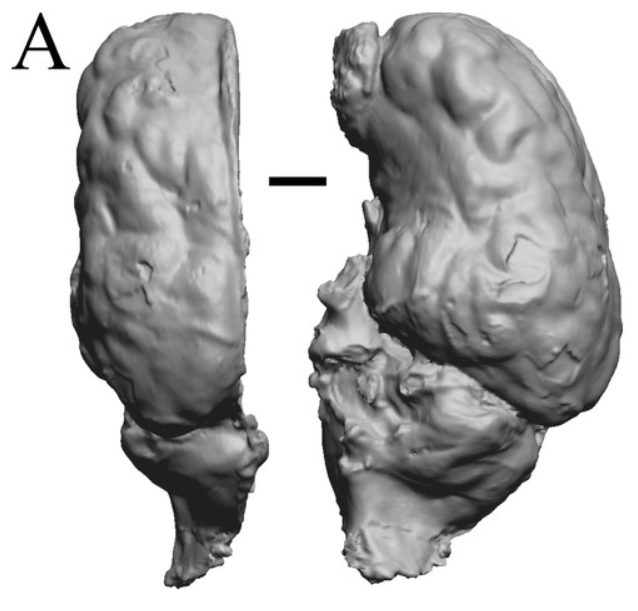
Partial endocast of Platygonus compressus (CM VP 12888 = FMNH PM 59058).

At Megenity Peccary Cave in Indiana, remains of over 650 individual flat-headed peccaries have been found. Of the Indiana site, a paleontologist noted:

“So the question is then: did they live here? Or did they all have a misfortune and die here? It’s a little of both, but it’s mainly that they probably inhabited this cave and rock shelter for most of that time period.”

At Bat Cave in Missouri 98 individuals have been found together. Caves could possibly have been used for protection from extreme weather.

== Ecology ==
Flat-headed peccaries are often found in small groups up to 12 individuals. It is likely that Platygonus compressus lived in varying herd numbers from 2-100, as well as modern peccary species. It is believed to have been an open forest browser. Fossil teeth show adaptation for coarser vegetation.
