= Burning Tree Mastodon =

Fossil site in Licking County, Ohio

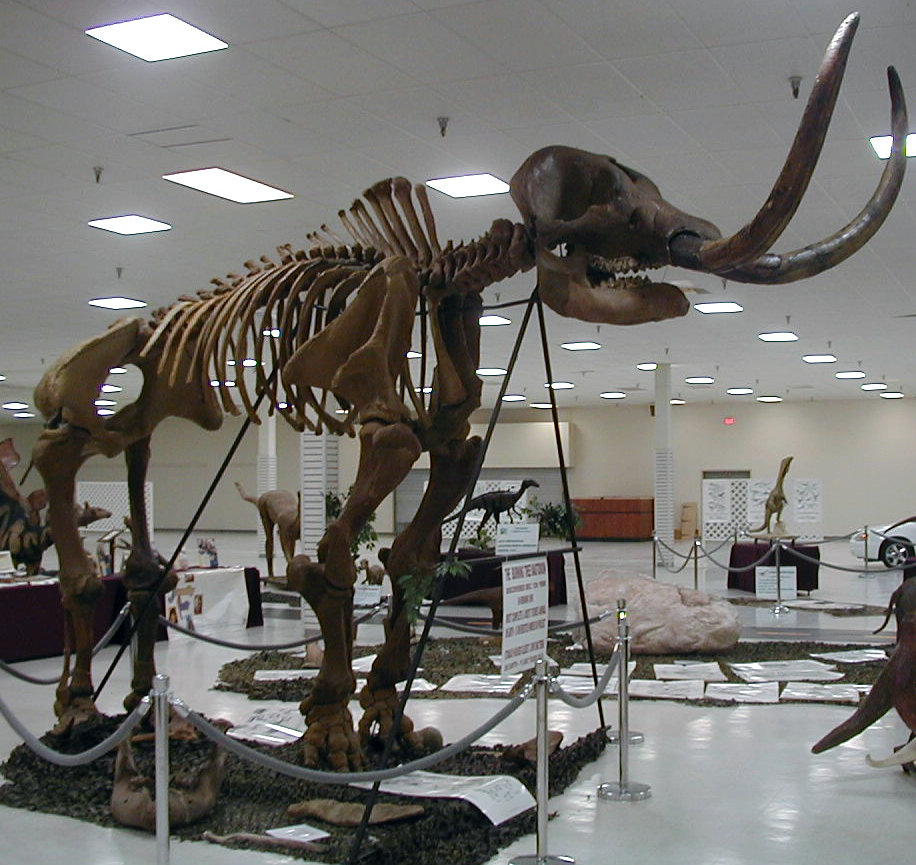
Replica of the near-complete skeleton of Mammut americanum - Burning Tree Mastodon (Upper Pleistocene, 11.39 ka) at the Burning Tree Golf Course

The Burning Tree Mastodon site in Heath, southern Licking County, Ohio, represents the location where the most complete skeleton of an American mastodon was found. It is dated to about 11,500 BP, and there is some evidence that there was human presence at the site at the time.

== Discovery ==
The specimen was discovered on December 12, 1989 by a Flower Excavating Company drag line operator who was digging a new pond on the Burning Tree Golf Course grounds. The drag line’s shovel caught and damaged the skull. In the following three days, the fossil was excavated during relatively bitter winter cold and blowing winds. Excavation was conducted by the Ohio Historical Society and the Licking County Archaeology & Landmarks Society and volunteers from several organizations.

=== Locality ===
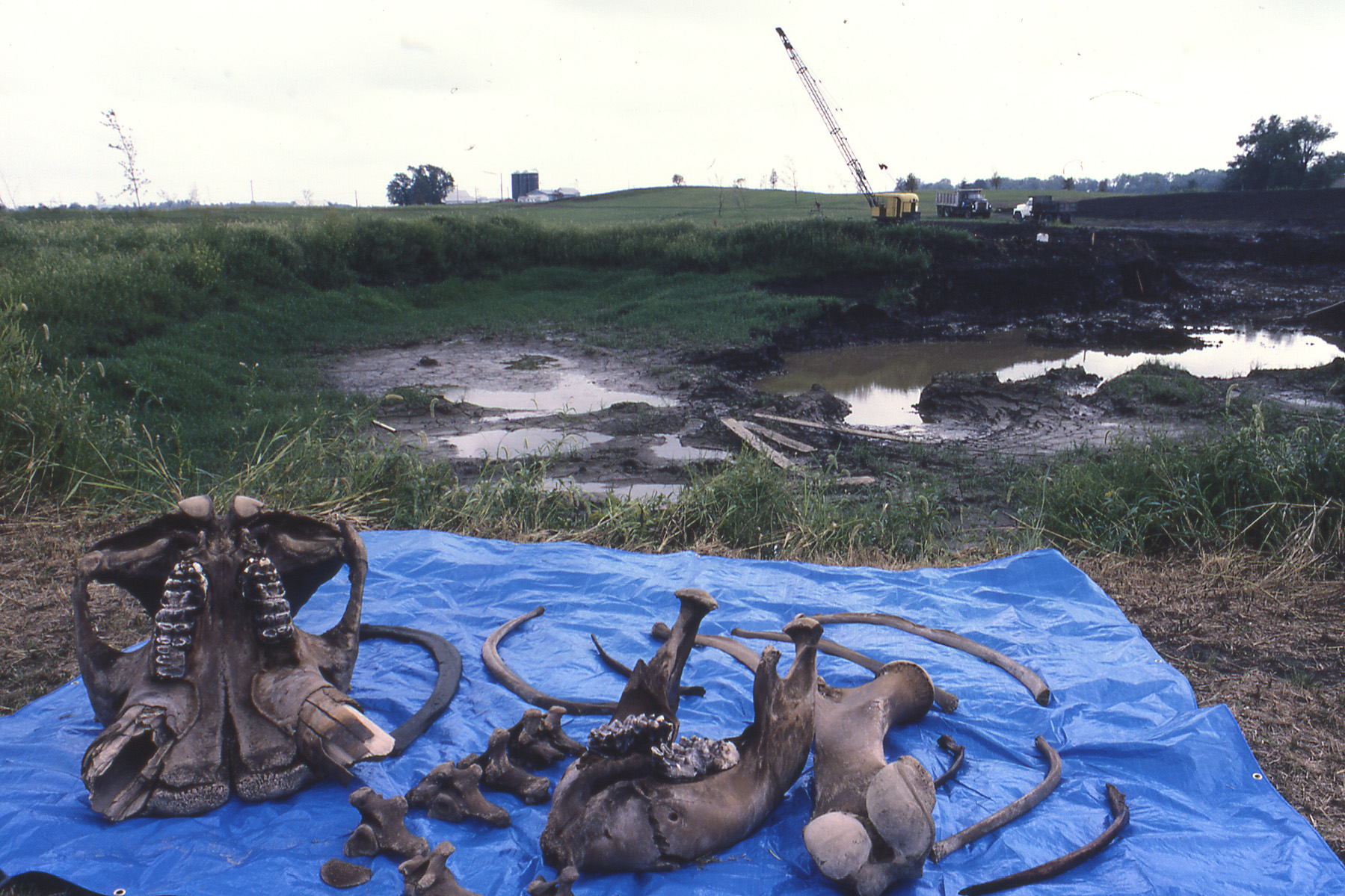
Burning Tree Mastodon excavation (mid-December 1989), Burning Tree Golf Course, Heath, east-central Ohio, United States

The locality was the grounds of the Burning Tree Golf Course, southern side of Ridgley Tract Road, just west of Lake Drive, south side of Heath, southern Licking County, central Ohio, United States.

== The American mastodon ==
The American mastodon is an extinct species of proboscidean mammal, Mammut americanum (Kerr, 1792) (Animalia, Chordata, Vertebrata, Mammalia, Proboscidea, Mammutidae). The only living proboscideans are the African elephants (Loxodonta africana and Loxodonta cyclotis) and the Asian elephant (Elephas maximus). Mammut americanum had a widespread distribution during the Pleistocene. Its fossil remains are found from Alaska to Florida, but are most commonly encountered in eastern America. On average, the American mastodon was around 5 meters long, 3 meters tall at the shoulder, and weighed between 3,500 and 4,500 kilograms. Living mastodons were covered with coarse, brownish hair, unlike modern elephants. Thick body hair on Pleistocene pachyderms was likely an evolutionary adaptation to harsh wintry climates.

Remains of more than 150 mastodons have been reported in Ohio, but only about a dozen or so are semi-complete. The Burning Tree Mastodon was approximately 30 years old at the time of its death and is 90-95% complete, missing only the right rear leg, a few tail bones, two ribs, and all the toe bones. The lower spine and right rib cage have healed injuries which have been interpreted as the result of battles with other mastodons.

Preserved stomach contents and intestinal contents were also recovered.

== Human presence ==
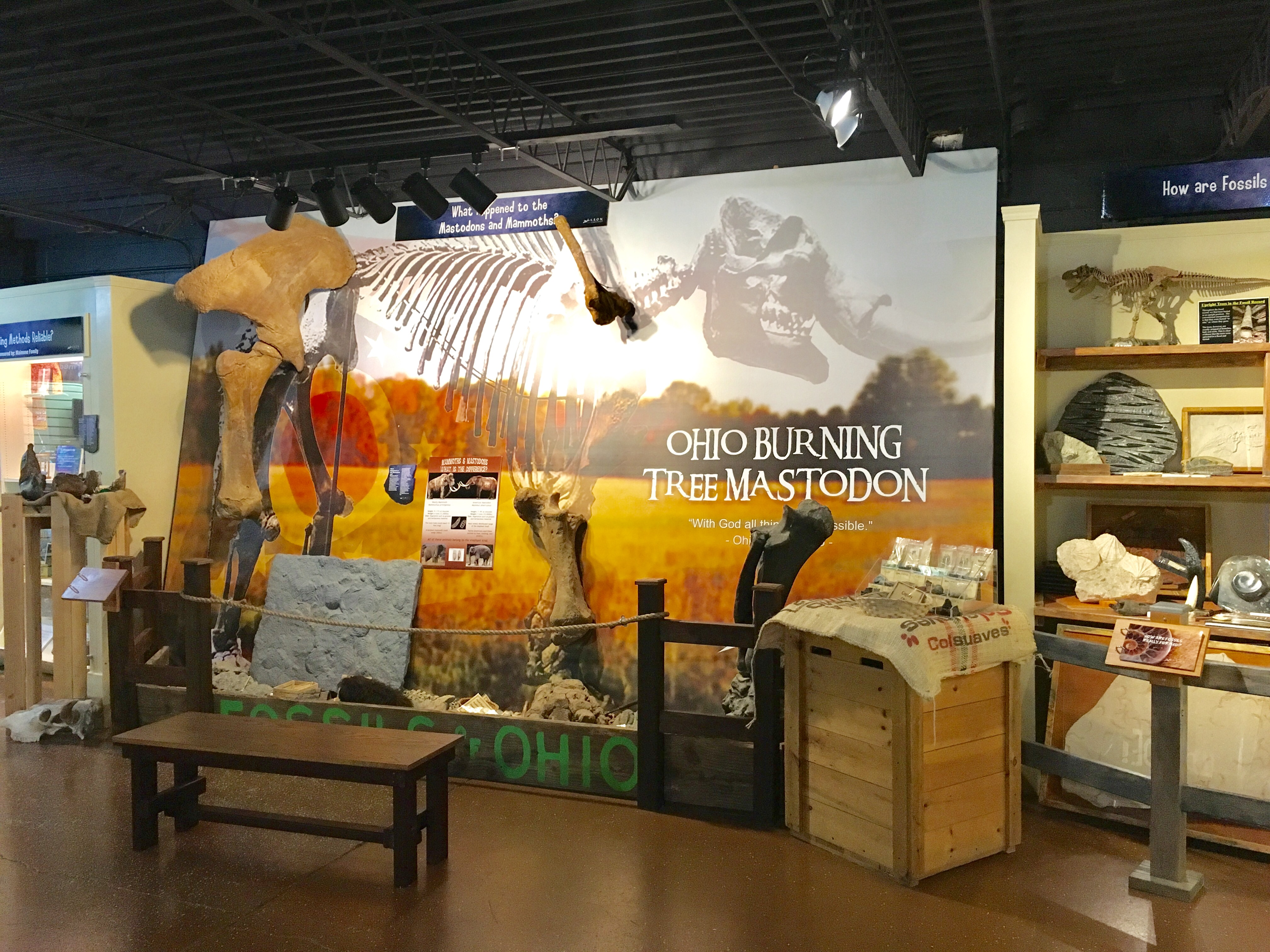
Burning Tree Mastodon Exhibit at the Akron Fossils & Science Center

Cut marks on some of the ribs indicate that this individual was butchered by early humans. Nevertheless, stone tools were not discovered in the area.

== Dating ==
Isotopic dating of wood closely associated with the skeleton gives dates of 11,450 to 11,660 years. Isotopic dating of actual bone material gives an 11,390 year date (during the Wisconsinan Glacial Interval of the near-latest Pleistocene).

== Diet ==
In addition to being near-complete, the Burning Tree Mastodon is remarkable in other ways. Preserved stomach contents indicated a diet of moss, seeds, leaves, water lilies, and swamp grass. Before this discovery, American mastodons were interpreted as having diets consisting principally of twigs and cones from evergreen trees.

=== Bacteria ===
Additionally, 38 species of still-living gut bacteria were isolated from preserved intestinal contents.

These ancient bacteria were, for a while, considered the oldest known living organisms anywhere on Earth. However, still-living gut bacteria have been isolated from insects in early Cenozoic amber and viable halobacteria have been recovered from Paleozoic and even late Precambrian rock salt.

The original Burning Tree Mastodon skeleton was sold in 1993 for over US$600,000; currently, it resides in a museum in Japan.

== Literature ==
Primary:

- Fisher, D.C., B.T. Lepper & P.E. Hooge. 1991. Taphonomic analysis of the Burning Tree Mastodont. Current Research in the Pleistocene 8: 88-91.
- Lepper, B.T., T.A. Frolking, D.C. Fisher, G. Goldstein, J.E. Sanger, D.A. Wymer, J.G. Ogden III & P.E. Hooge. 1991. Intestinal contents of a Late Pleistocene mastodont from midcontinental North America. Quaternary Research 36: 120-125.
- Fisher, D.C. & B.T. Lepper. 1994. Paleobiology, taphonomy, and archaeology of the Burning Tree Mastodon. Geological Association of Canada, Mineralogical Association of Canada Annual Meeting Program with Abstracts 19: 36.
- Goldstein, G. 1994. Isolation of living bacteria from the remains of an 11,000 year old mastodont. Geological Association of Canada, Mineralogical Association of Canada Annual Meeting Program with Abstracts 19: 42.
- Fisher, D.C., B.T. Lepper & P.E. Hooge. 1994. Evidence for butchery of the Burning Tree Mastodon. pp. 43-57 in The First Discovery of America, Archaeological Evidence of the Early Inhabitants of the Ohio Area. Columbus. Ohio Archaeological Council.
- Frolking, T.A. 1994. Late-Quaternary environments and landscape evolution of the Burning Tree Mastodon site, Licking County, Ohio. Geological Association of Canada, Mineralogical Association of Canada Annual Meeting Program with Abstracts 19: 39.
- Lepper, B.T. & D.C. Fisher. 1994. Discovery, recovery, and stratigraphic context of the Burning Tree Mastodon, Licking County, Ohio, USA. Geological Association of Canada, Mineralogical Association of Canada Annual Meeting Program with Abstracts 19: 63.
- Morgan, A.V. & J.J. Pilny. 1994. Fossil insects (Coleoptera) from the Burning Tree Mastodon site, Licking County, Ohio. Geological Association of Canada, Mineralogical Association of Canada Annual Meeting Program with Abstracts 19: 79.
- Sanger, J.E. & D.S. Rutter. 1994. Paleolimnology of the Burning Tree Mastodont pond. Geological Association of Canada, Mineralogical Association of Canada Annual Meeting Program with Abstracts 19: 98.
- Wymer, D.A. & L. Scott. 1994. The Burning Tree Mastodon paleobotany: gut contents and the peat matrix. Geological Association of Canada, Mineralogical Association of Canada Annual Meeting Program with Abstracts 19: 122.
- Rhodes, A.N., J.W. Urbance, H. Youga, H. Corlew-Newman, C.A. Reddy, M.J. Klug, J.M. Tiedje & D.C. Fisher. 1998. Identification of bacterial isolates obtained from intestinal contents associated with 12,000-year-old mastodon remains. Applied and Environmental Microbiology 64: 651-658.

Secondary:

- Hansen, M.C. 1990. Mastodon skeleton discovered in Licking County. Ohio Geology Winter 1990: 1, 3-4.
- Lepper, B.T. 1990. The Burning Tree Mastodon: a nearly complete skeleton from Licking County, Ohio. Mammoth Trumpet 6(1): 7.
- Kaczmarek, S. 1991. Mastodon remains yield important discoveries. Echoes [Ohio Historical Society] 30(6): 2-3.
- Lafferty, M.B. 1991. The great mastodon question. Columbus Dispatch 12 May 1991: D1.
- Anonymous. 1992. The Burning Tree Mastodon - "A time machine into the Ice Age". Ward's Bulletin Spring 1992: 1, 11.
- Folger, T. 1992. Oldest living bacteria tell all. Discover January 1992: 30-31.
- Feldmann, R.M. and 23 others. 1997 (dated 1996). Fossils of Ohio. Ohio Division of Geological Survey Bulletin 70: xix, 299, 366-367.
- Loer, D. 2001. Mastodon left only a memory. Columbus Dispatch 28 January 2001: B1.
- Lepper, B.T. 2003. Mastodon bones yield telltale clues to beast's demise. Columbus Dispatch 18 November 2003.
