= Sandy Springs, Ohio =

Unincorporated community in Ohio, U.S.

Coordinates: 38°36′40″N 83°17′49″W

Sandy Springs is an unincorporated community in Adams County, Ohio, United States, located at .

== History ==
A post office called Sandy Springs was established in 1818. Sandy Springs once had its own school.

== Notable people ==
Annie Turner Wittenmyer, Social reformer and relief worker
