= Nobles Pond site =

Nobles Pond Site
- Location within Ohio
- 40°51′18.71″N 81°28′54.72″W
- Location: North Canton, Ohio

Nobles Pond Site is a 25-acre archaeological site near Canton in Stark County, Ohio, and is a historical site with The Ohio Historical Society. It is one of the largest Clovis culture sites in North America. At the end of the Ice age, about 10,500 to 11,500 years ago, a large number of Paleo-Indians, the first people to live in Ohio, camped at the site. Artifacts on the site, primarily excavated by volunteers, provide insight into how they made and used tools, obtained materials, and how they lived.

It is an important site because it is one of the early Paleo-Indian sites in the Midwest. There is a historical marker at the site by The Ohio Historical Society. since 1992. Nobles Pond is now in a park for a residential area in North Canton, Ohio.

== Excavation ==
An emergency excavation on the site began in 1988 and was estimated to be completed in 1990. Dr. Mark Seeman led an investigation of the site with students and volunteers before a housing development was built on the site. In nine places near Nobles Pond, they found stone tools grouped in clusters and an area that indicated either areas for specific activities or house floors of a structure. Artifacts found at the site were analyzed and curated.

== Analysis ==
A study of the ways in which the stone tools were made was published by Michael J. Shott and Mark F. Seeman. The source and variety of the stone for tools can tell a lot about a group, whether it is sedentary with base camps or travels from place-to-place to find food. It could also identify whether a group of people engages with other groups of people. Brian Patrick Kooyman states that “The Noble Pond occupants were undoubtedly mobile foragers and the lithic material is wholly dominated by non-local lithic material, conforming to the expected pattern of use of non-local material by mobile groups.

People of the Clovis culture are generally thought to be big game hunters, but analysis of eight Clovis points stained with blood have down that the Paleo-Indians of the Nobles Pond Site hunted a wide range of animals. They were found to have hunted elk, caribou, deer, bison, bear, and rabbit. Some points had more blood stains from multiple animals. While there is some surprise that Paleo-Indians ate rabbit, the Cree First Nations people from northern Ontario who have a diet that relies to a great extent on rabbit, as noted by anthropologist Bruce Winterhalder.

== Large congregation sites ==
Another Paleo-Indian site in northern Ohio, Paleo Crossing site, had evidence of a congregation site for groups of people. The Nobles Pond Site had a larger congregation site for nomadic groups. Other sites with large-scale Paleo-Indian occupation include the Vail site in Maine, DEDIC/Sugarloaf Site in Massachusetts, and in Ontario—Udora site, Parkhill site, and Fisher.
