= Paleo Crossing site =

Archaeological site in Ohio, United States

- Paleo Crossing Site
- U.S. National Register of Historic Places
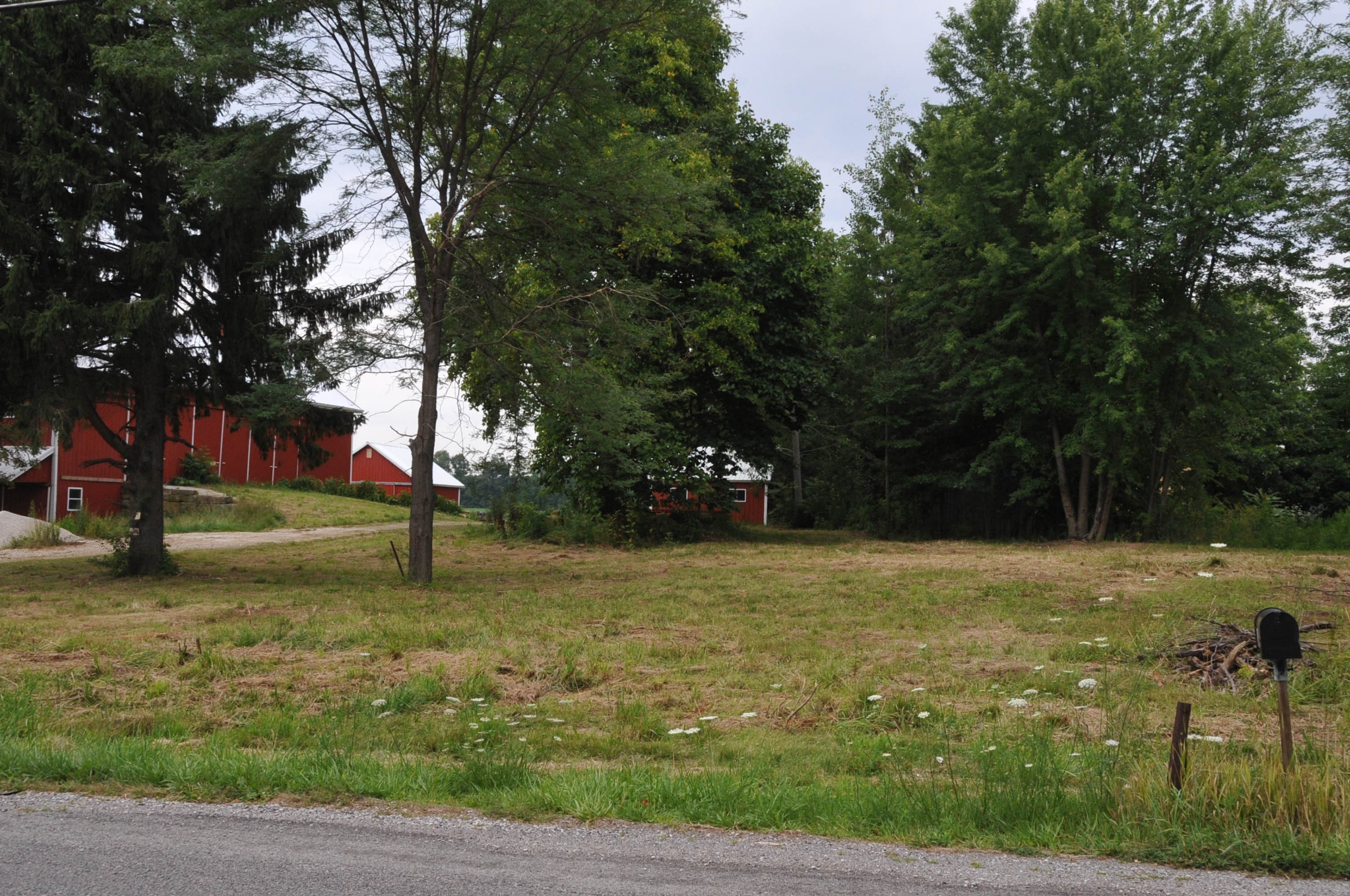

- Location within Ohio Location within the United States
- Location: Northwest of the junction of Ridgewood and State Roads, Sharon Township, Medina County, Ohio (private)
- Nearest city: Sharon Center, Ohio
- Coordinates: 41°7′19.92″N 81°43′13.22″W
- NRHP reference No.: 92000972
- Added to NRHP: July 30, 1992

The Paleo Crossing Site, also known as the Old Dague Farm Site, is an archaeological site near Sharon Center, Ohio in Medina County where Clovis artifacts dated to 10,980 ± 75 years Before Present (B.P.) were found. The Cleveland Museum of Natural History conducted an excavation from 1990 to 1993. The site provides evidence of Paleo-Indians in northern Ohio and may be the area's oldest residents and archaeologist Dr. David Brose believes that they may be "some of the oldest certain examples of human activity in the New World." The site contains charcoal recovered from refuse pits. There were also two post holes and blades and tools, 80% of which were made from flint (Wyandotte chert) from the Ohio River Valley in Indiana, 500 miles from Paleo Crossing, which indicates that the hunter-gatherers had a widespread social network and traveled across distances relatively quickly. The post holes are evidence that there was a shelter built on the site.

The site was listed on the National Register of Historic Places on July 30, 1992.

== Excavation ==
Paleo Clovis points and multiple ancient tools were discovered by James D. Remington, a local artist with a keen eye and interest in the natural world. So much so that he was astute enough to realize a newly turned field would yield valuable historical treasure. He then recognized his finds were a unique bounty—not the random arrowhead of a hunter. Sharon Township, Wadsworth, Ohio. From 1990 to 1993, the site was excavated by the Cleveland Museum of Natural History. Dr. David Brose, the former Curator of Archaeology, found the spearheads were in the style of Clovis points of the Paleo-Indians and "some of the oldest certain examples of human activity in the New World." The Clovis culture spread across North America and the people are thought to be the ancestors of most native peoples in America. There are about 200 Clovis sites on the continent, but most did not provide a lot of information about the Clovis lifestyle.

The Paleo Crossing Site, one of the oldest sites in Ohio, had two or three post holes and refuse pits that contained charcoal. From radiocarbon dating, the site was used 10,980 ± 75 years B.P. or about 9,000 B.C. The post holes and an area about 150 square feet indicate that there was a structure at the site. If so, it would be the oldest structure ever found in North America. The structure, carbon-dated at about 10,200 B.C., could have burned, based on the presence of charcoal found in a post hole. More recently scientists have called into serious question the radiocarbon dates from the site, questioning the provenience of the source material stating "On the basis of this new understanding of the site, all previously reported ages for Paleo Crossing are disregarded and the site is defined as undated.".

More than 10,000 artifacts were found at the site. Most of the flint tools were made from stone unique to a quarry about 500 kilometres (310 miles) away in southern Indiana. Most of the tools and blades found at the site were heavily reworked, presumably because of the long distance from the source of material.

== Terrain ==
When Paleo-Indians visited the site, glacial ice had probably receded and it is likely that it was a "lush" environment with vegetation. A bog was nearby, which would have lured animals, like mastodons to the water. The structure was placed above what was once a bog and below a ridge. The bog is now wet farmland.

== Analysis of artifacts ==
The artifacts were stored at the Cleveland Museum of Natural History, where analysis was conducted. A person integral to the work was Metin Eren who began his efforts when, as a junior in high school, he joined the Museum's field program in 2000. Now with a Ph.D. in anthropology, Eren and Dr. Brian Redmond, Curator of Archaeology, have collaborated on papers describing the Paleo Crossing stone tool collection. The paper published in 2014 confirmed the hypothesis that the flint originated in the Ohio River Valley in southern Indiana. It was published in the Journal of Archaeological Science. In their paper, Redmond and Eren concluded that the distance between the site of the flint in Indiana and the Paleo Crossing Site provides "strong inferential material evidence that the fast expansion of the Clovis culture across the continent occurred as a result of a geographically widespread hunter-gatherer social network." In addition, they believe that the people at Paleo Crossing probably traveled more than 500 kilometers, because hunter-gatherers don't travel in a straight line. Based on topography, they may have traveled 825 kilometres (513 miles), or more than 1,000 kilometres (620 miles) if they followed rivers.

Small bands of hunters used the four acre site as a place to meet up with one another and exchange information, perform ceremonial rituals, and plan hunts for big game.

There is more analysis that could be conducted. For instance, Eren would like to take chert fragments and reassemble them into whole tools. It was that type of study by Kent State University at the Nobles Pond site. The 22-acre Nobles Pond site in Stark County was a larger meeting place for bands of hunters, with a large collection of tools made from Ohio flint.

More work could also be dating materials other than the charcoal and determining the sources of other stone.

== Current land use ==
The Paleo Crossing Site is in a residential area.
