= Welling site =

- Location within Ohio
- 40°20′0″N 82°4′0″W
- Location: Nellie, Coshocton County, Ohio

The Welling site is an archaeological site of the Paleo-Indian period, meaning the time of the earliest humans. Located in Coshocton County, Ohio, it was a site for quarrying stone in the Upper Mercer chert source area. Based upon the microwear analysis of stone tools, it is believed to be a base camp where people learned and shared Clovis tool-making techniques, ate, exchanged information, and perhaps found mates from others groups.

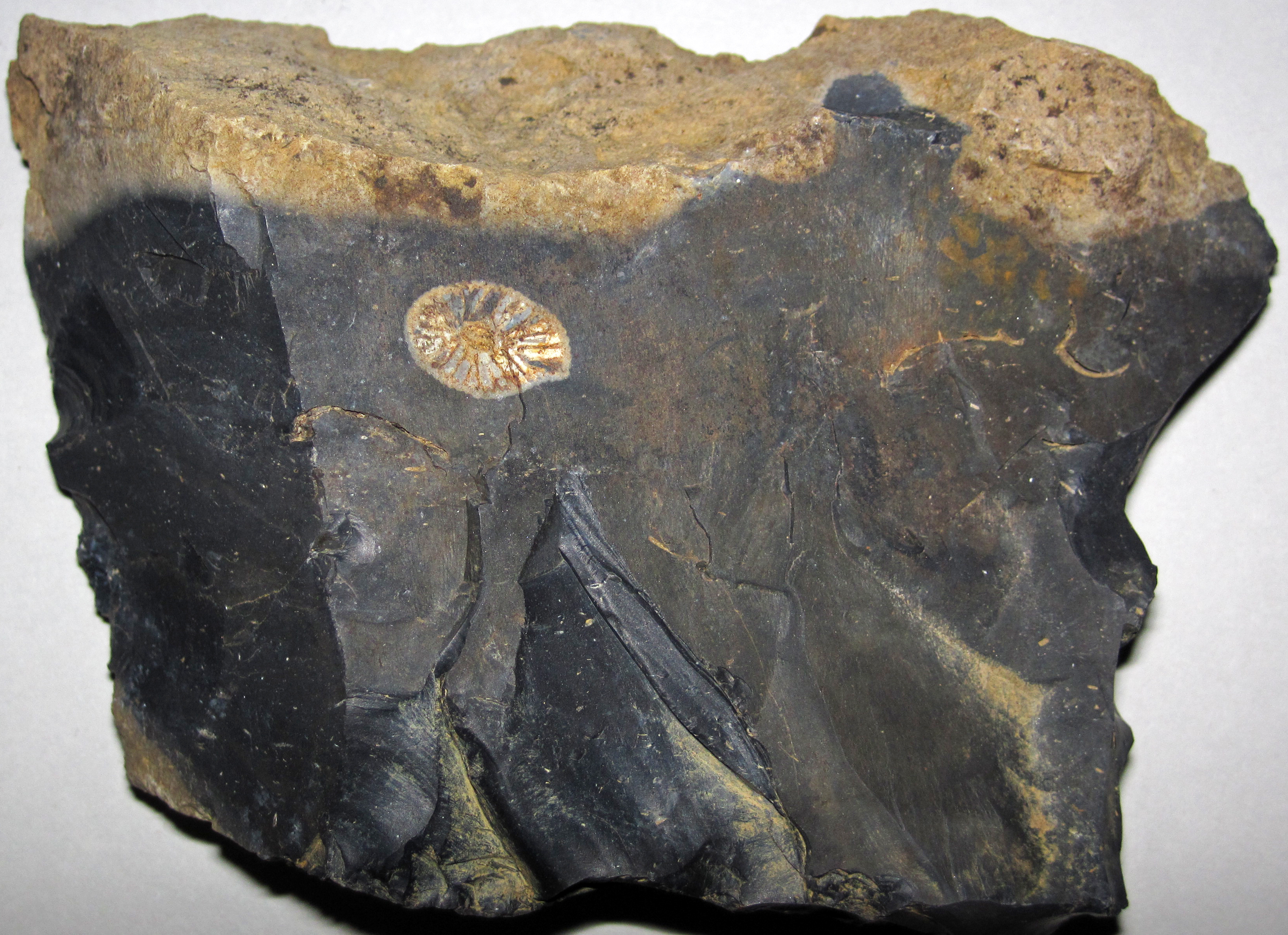
Upper Mercer flint, Nellie West Outcrop, Coshocton County, Ohio

The site is located on the eastern boundary of the town of Nellie in the Walhonding River Valley. It is at the edge of the Allegheny Plateau, which was never covered by ice during the last ice age. The hills on either side of the valley are composed of bedrock of the Upper Mercer and Pottsville series. The use of Upper Mercer flint by prehistoric people was first reported in 1945. The flint was quarried and used to make stone tools. The site is 15 feet above the Walhonding River floodplain. Located between a township road and a railroad cut, the site may have been altered when a railroad line was built, particularly where Archaic tools were found.

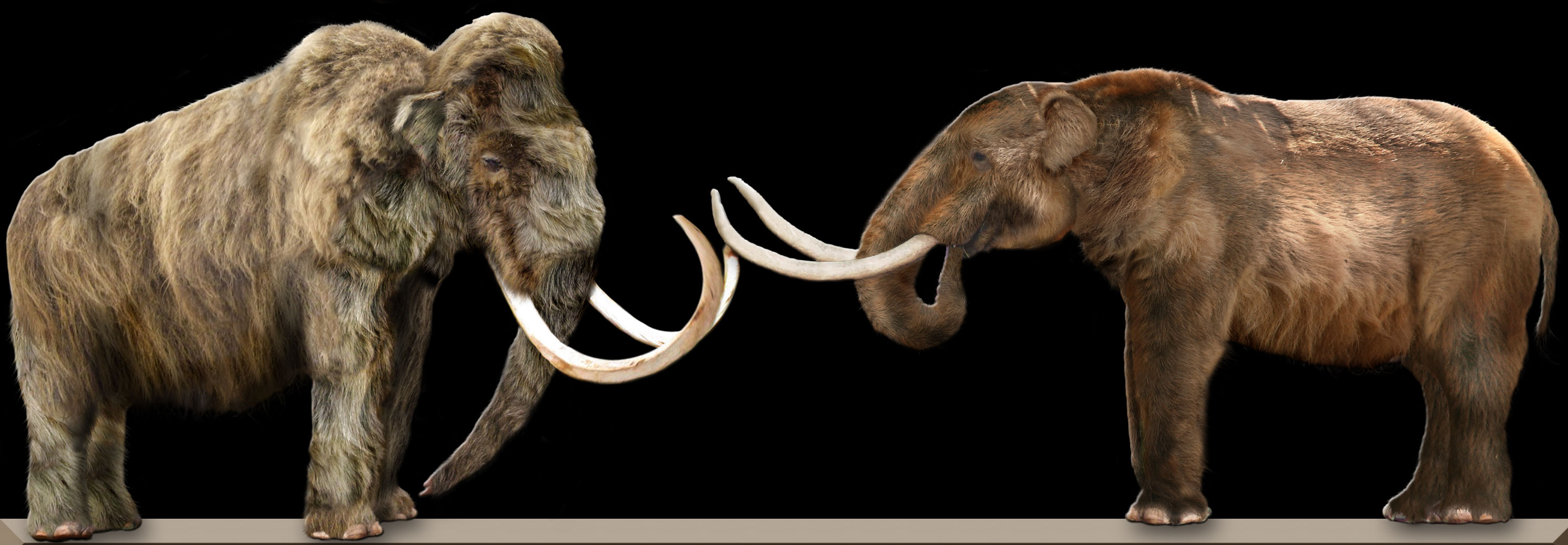
The woolly mammoth (L) and American mastodon (R) of the Paleo-Indian period

The site was discovered in 1963 or in the winter of 1964–1965 by Carroll Welling, who found two flint tools near his home. A group of people from Case Institute of Technology excavated the site in August 1965. Among the artifacts were 54 fluted points of the Paleo-Indian period, some of which were finished and others unfinished. Six Kirk complex and ten Brewerton complex projectile points, including corner- and side-notched points, found at the site were created during the Archaic period. The large amount of flint debris, and various states of tool completion, (Note: According to John Edward Blank, "The manufacture of lithic artifacts is a continuous process that transforms and reduces unmodified raw material into a finished artifact.") indicates that the site was a "workshop" area for creation of tools. The tools were made of flint from the site, except for four fluted points made from light brown Vanport flint. Most of the material from the Woodland period were also of Upper Mercer flint. Scrapers were among the tools, as were tools from the Plano complex.

In 1970, Norman L. Wright, an amateur archaeologist, worked on another nearby site, the McConnell site (6500 to 8500 BC). Wright and Olaf Prufer of Kent State University performed research by comparing artifacts found at the Welling site with those of other Paleo-Indian sites. They also wrote an article about the Welling site (10,000 to 11,800 BC) for the Ohio Archaeologist. Based on their analysis, the Welling site is an early Paleo-Indian site. Thousands of tools were made at the site over many centuries. The earliest are fluted points from 12,000 B.C. and defined as "classically Paleo-Indian" and were created at the time of the now-extinct mastodons.

When Paleo-Indians procured stone for tool-making, there were opportunities to meet up with other groups who also needed raw material. Stone outcrops, like at the Welling site, were a natural meeting spot to learn about techniques for making complex Clovis fluted projectile points with a ready supply of material for practice. Using microwear analysis of stone tools, researchers find that Welling site was an outcrop-related base camp where people assembled in large groups and interacted, ate, and exchanged information with other groups as they quarried for stone. They may have found mates among people of other groups.

Tools that the site were used for processing meat and hides following a hunt, such as for butchering meat, sawing bones, scraping fresh and dry hides, and cutting hides. Tools were created for sawing and scraping wood, scraping bone or antlers, and scraping plants.
