= Great Hopewell Road =

Connector between Hopewell culture sites in Ohio

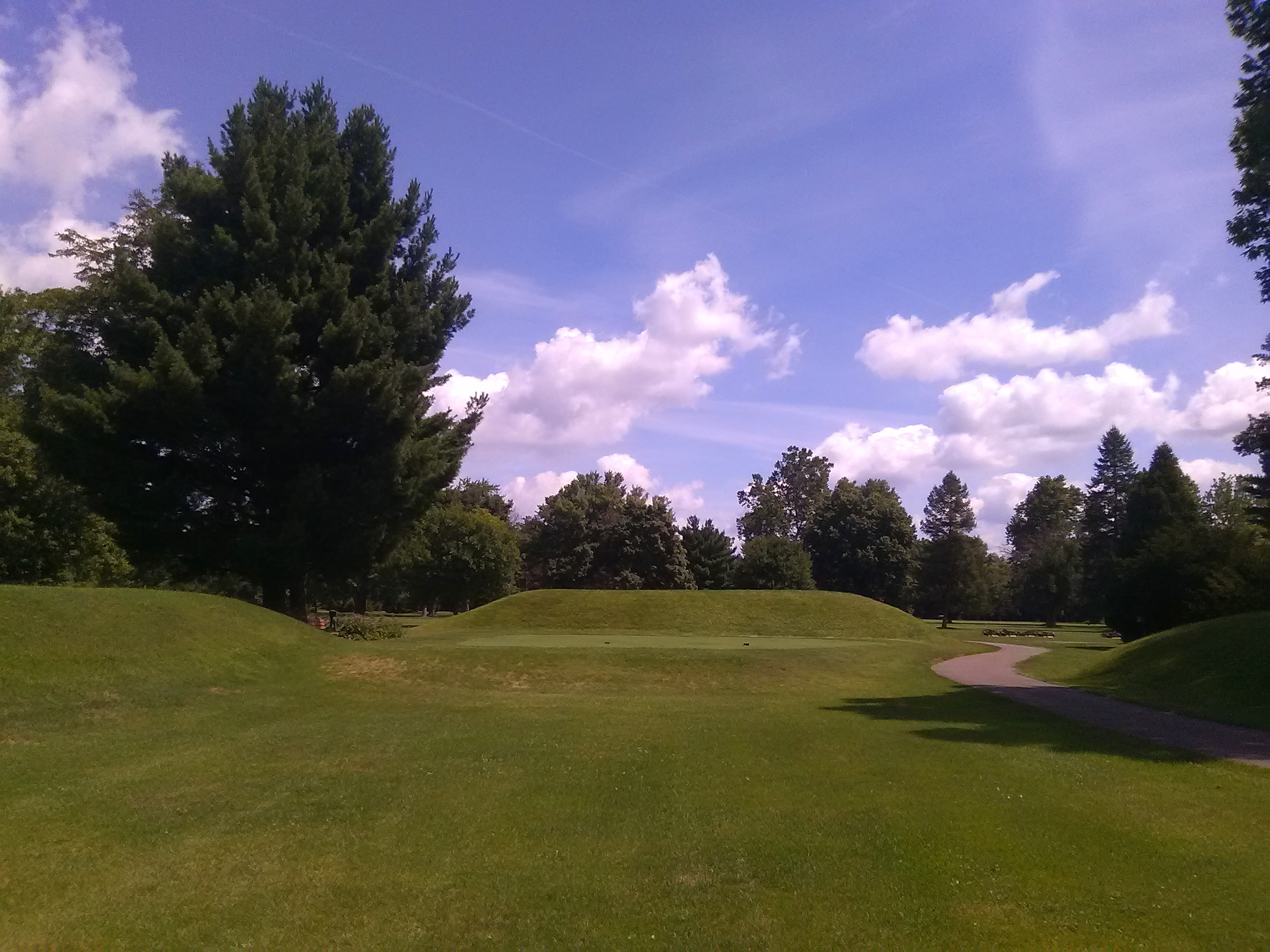
The Octagon Earthwork at the Newark Earthworks site, the northern terminus of the Great Hopewell Road

The Great Hopewell Road is an hypothesized prehistoric walled road in the eastern United States, of which some remnants remain. Specifically, it is thought to have connected two Hopewell culture (100 BCE–500 CE) earthwork monuments located in Newark and Chillicothe, Ohio, a distance of 60 miles (97 km). The Newark complex was built 2,000 to 1,800 years ago and forms the northern terminus of the road. The southern terminus has not been definitively determined but is currently hypothesized to be one of the earthworks near Chillicothe, potentially the High Bank Works. There is precedent for such sacred roads at other complexes in North and South America.

The first 2.5 miles (4.0 km) south of the parallel-walled roadway of the Newark Earthworks is known as the Van Voorhis Walls; this confirmed earthwork terminates at Ramp Creek in Heath. South of there, the projected path of the Hopewell Road passes through fields toward Millersport. Evidence from early accounts, aerial photography, satellite imagery, and LiDAR suggest that the Hopewell Road may continue south of Ramp Creek.

== Description ==
The Great Hopewell Road is thought to have connected the Newark Earthworks in Newark, Ohio, to an undetermined site approximately 60 miles (97 km) away in Chillicothe. The azimuth of the road is 212° 20'. Today, the path is mostly uninterrupted farmland, and most of the road has been destroyed; however, in 1995, two parallel walls were still visible above ground in a woodland about 2 miles (3.2 km) south of the Newark Earthworks. This 2.5-mile (4.0 km) section from the Newark Octagon south to Ramp Creek is now known as the "Van Voorhis Walls" and is located at 40°01′44.4″N 82°27′29.7″W. Additional examination of the area with LiDAR suggests the road was lower than the surrounding land, sunk between the walls. Other traces of road south of the Van Voorhis Walls have since been found; in 2008, evidence of four potential segments of road were located using airborne LiDAR.

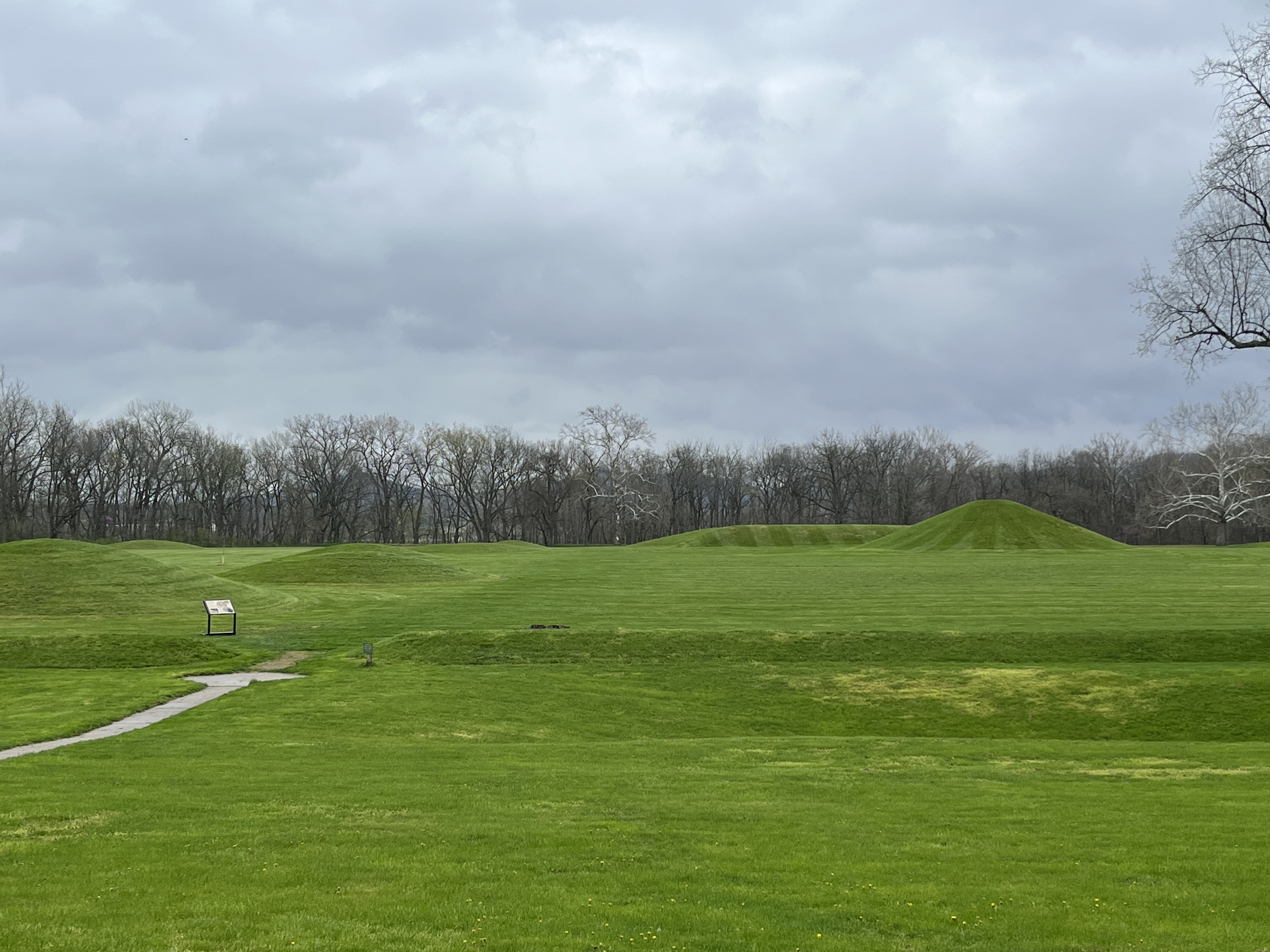
High Bank Works, a candidate for the southern end of the Great Hopewell Road

In 2009, test excavations near the Van Voorhis Walls revealed a thin layer of white limestone, which could potentially have been used to pave the road; similar paving was known to have been performed in other parts of North and South America. One such report is of a "white road" described by the Lenape people, who used such large roads for international travel, cutting through the terrain and covering the pathway with white sand.

The southern terminus of the road has not been determined with certainty, although it has been hypothesized based on the trajectory of the road's path to be near modern-day Chillicothe, considered the epicenter of Hopewell culture. Archaeologist Brad Lepper has suggested that the road may have connected the Newark complex to one of several sites along the Scioto River Valley, such as the High Bank Works or the Hopeton Earthworks. High Bank and the Newark Earthworks are the only two known Hopewellian sites to have both large circular and octagonal enclosures, which may have had some astronomical and/or spiritual significance.

== History of study ==
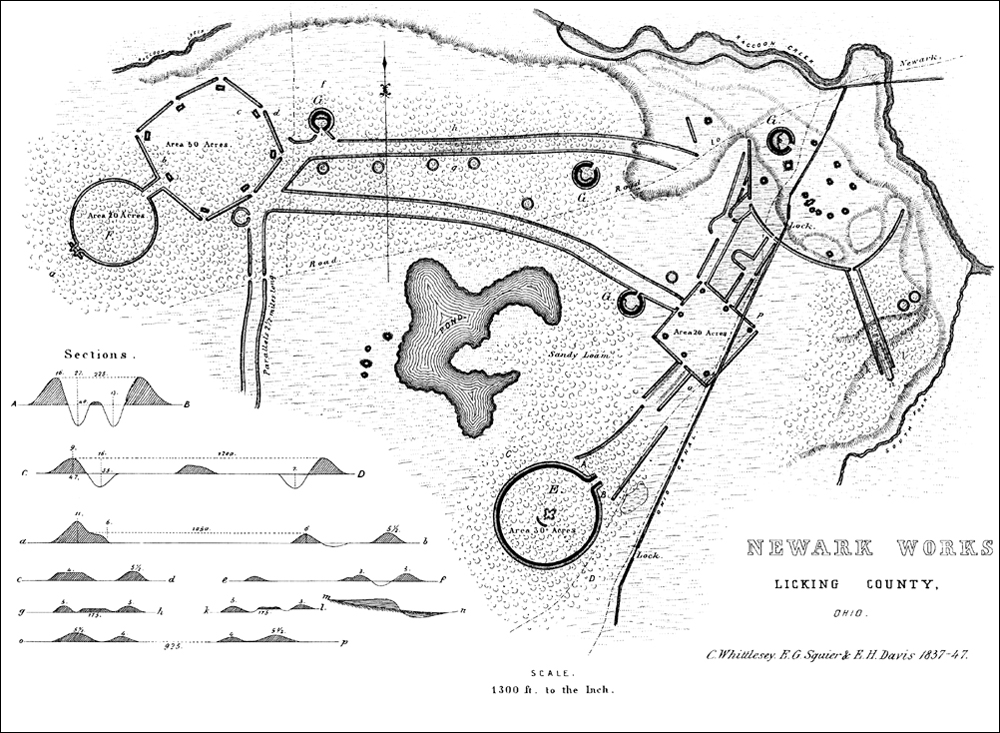
1848 map showing the beginning of the Great Hopewell Road extending from the south of the Octagon Earthwork

Historians and archaeologists have speculated about the existence of a road running southward from the Newark Earthworks in Newark since the early 19th century. In 1820, Caleb Atwater claimed in Descriptions of the Antiquities Discovered in the State of Ohio that a southwesterly road may have extended for at least 30 miles (48 km), potentially ending at a site at the Hocking River. In 1848, Ephraim G. Squier and Edwin H. Davis mapped two parallel earthen walls extending southwards for 2.5 miles (4.0 km).

In 1862, brothers Charles and James Salisbury surveyed the first 6 miles (9.7 km) of this road, noting it was marked by parallel earthen banks almost 200 feet (61 m) apart and leading from the Newark Earthworks. The Salisburys determined that the extant road ended at Ramp Creek, a tributary of the South Fork Licking River, but said that the road likely extended much farther south from Newark in the direction of Chillicothe. Early settlers did report the existence of previous traces of roadway further south but that large swaths of these earthworks had since been destroyed or otherwise no longer existed.

In the 1930s, aerial surveys revealed traces of the road which extended for 12 miles (19 km) toward the Hopewellian center of present-day Chillicothe. Pilots Warren Weiant, Jr. and Dache Reeves recorded and photographed extant parallel lines demarcating the road's width. Brad Lepper was the first to name the pathway the "Great Hopewell Road" in 1995. Further aerial imagery and LiDAR studies since the 1990s suggest more subsurface traces of the road south of Ramp Creek still exist.

== Purpose ==
There are no surviving or recorded Native American histories for this specific road or the associated sites, but parallels have been drawn between the Great Hopewell Road and other pathways constructed by Native American cultures across North and South America, such as the Maya, Ancestral Puebloans, Nazca, and Mississippians. These cultural routes were often constructed with the intention of travelling in as straight a line as possible, often also built in alignment with celestial bodies. Likewise, the Great Hopewell Road may have been used as a corridor between sites of spiritual significance, as a pilgrimage route, and/or as a connection between nations. Other scholars also propose that goods may have travelled and been traded along the road.

Hopewellian sites have a documented history of archaeoastronomical importance. The road may have been built to be purposely aligned with specific stars during certain times of the year; its azimuth aligns with the position of the sun during the summer and winter solstices at sunset and sunrise, respectively. Additionally, the track aligns with the contemporary setting of the star Capella, and by extension, the northern branch of the Milky Way Galaxy.

The method of construction and orienting of the road is also debated. Archaeoastronomist Giulio Magli has suggested that tracing a linear path over a long distance may have been achieved by use of both astronomical calculations and visual ground markers, such as use of a grid or aligning the path to a star.

== See also ==
- List of archaeoastronomical sites by country
- List of Hopewell sites
- Natchez Trace
