= Hopewell Ceremonial Earthworks =

UNESCO World Heritage Site in Ohio, US

UNESCO World Heritage Site
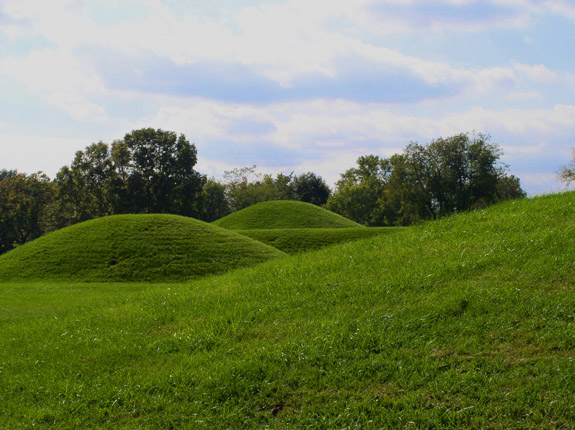
- Mounds at Mound City – one of eight earthworks included in the site
- Interactive map of Hopewell Ceremonial Earthworks
- Criteria: (i)(iii)
- Reference: 1689
- Inscription: 2023 (45th Session)

Hopewell Ceremonial Earthworks are a World Heritage Site in the United States preserving eight monumental earthworks constructed by the Hopewell tradition. The sites consist of large geometric shapes covering several acres in area. Constructed between approximately 1 and 400 CE, the earthworks lie along tributaries of the Ohio River in the present-day state of Ohio. They depict the richness and depth of precontact culture, science, astronomy, and sacred monumental architecture. Many sites were plowed and reduced in size during almost 200 years of agricultural use.

In 2008, the Department of the Interior submitted Hopewell Ceremonial Earthworks as one of 14 sites on its tentative list from which the United States makes nominations for the UNESCO World Heritage Sites. UNESCO inscribed the earthworks as the United States' 25th and newest World Heritage Site on September 19, 2023. The complexes are owned and managed by the National Park Service and Ohio History Connection.

== Background ==
The Ohio Hopewell was an expression of the Hopewell culture that was dominant in southern Ohio. This region contains the largest concentration of Hopewell sites and was a center of the Hopewell interaction sphere which encompassed much of current North America, from the Rocky Mountains to Florida. Although the precise relation to other Hopewell sites is unclear, exotic goods from across North America such as obsidian from Wyoming, shells from the Gulf of Mexico, and copper from Michigan's upper peninsula have been found in huge quantities at these sites. These goods were fashioned into elaborate artifacts like carved sheets of mica and stone animal effigy pipes.

The exact function or specific construction timelines for the mounds remain unclear due to centuries of neglect and destruction, lack of written or oral information and the unique nature of the sites. Various factors indicate that population sizes both at specific sites and in the general area were relatively low. There is no evidence of intensive agriculture or large settled societies. As a result, it is believed that the mounds were constructed by hunter-gatherers as ceremonial and burial sites, in contrast with centralized mound-building societies like those at Cahokia centuries later.

Locations of the eight Hopewell Ceremonial Earthworks in Ohio

== Sites ==
The monument consists of eight Hopewell sites throughout southern Ohio.

Picture	ID	Name	Location	Description	Coordinates
	1689-001	Octagon Earthworks	Newark, Ohio	A 50 acres (0.20 km^{2}) area surrounded by eight 10 ft (3.0 m) high earthen walls. A 12 ft (3.7 m) high "Observatory" mound is located between the Octagon and an earthen circle 1,054 ft (321 m) in diameter. The site was precisely built, probably to align with numerous solar and lunar events. The Octagon and Great Circle were linked by numerous earthen pathways and surrounded by smaller mounds. Both sites owned by Ohio History Connection.	40°3′13.17″N 82°26′45.82″W
	1689-002	Great Circle Earthworks	Newark, Ohio	A 1,200 ft (370 m) diameter circle with 16 ft (4.9 m) high walls. A large ditch surrounds the inside of the circle and a large mound built over a ceremonial altar sits at the center. The Octagon and Great Circle were linked by numerous earthen pathways and surrounded by smaller mounds. Both sites owned by Ohio History Connection.	40°2′28.44″N 82°25′48.43″W
	1689-003	Hopeton Earthworks	Chillicothe, Ohio	900 ft (270 m) x 950 ft (290 m) rectangle connected to 1,050 ft (320 m) diameter circle with a long ceremonial walkway to the Scioto River and Mound City on the opposite bank. Potentially a unique ceremonial area as there are comparatively few burials or mortuary sites within the enclosure. Owned and managed by the National Park Service as a part of Hopewell Culture National Historical Park.	40°3′13.17″N 82°26′45.82″W
	1689-004	Mound City	Chillicothe, Ohio	24 Mounds of varying sizes and purposes surrounded by a low embankment wall across the Scioto River from the Hopeton Earthworks. Most display evidence of burial and/or ceremonial use and large numbers of artistic objects made of exotic materials have been found in the mound. Heavily degraded by over a century of agricultural use. Site of Hopewell Culture National Historical Park visitor center.	39°22′35.36″N 83°0′14.36″W
	1689-005	High Bank Works	Chillicothe, Ohio	Rare octagonal enclosure connected to a large circle. The octagon is aligned with various astronomical phenomenon. These alignments and the complex's shape suggest it is related to the Newark Octagon over 55 mi (89 km) away. Heavily degraded by agricultural use. Owned and managed by the National Park Service as a part of Hopewell Culture National Historical Park.	39°17′54.82″N 82°55′6.56″W
	1689-006	Hopewell Mound Group	Chillicothe, Ohio	The type site for the Hopewell culture, the group consists of over 40 mounds surrounded by over 2.5 mi (4.0 km) of walls enclosing 110 acres (45 ha). The presence of clay lined ditches and nearby springs imply the site may have had water permanently flowing through it. Owned and managed by the National Park Service as a part of Hopewell Culture National Historical Park.	39°21′39.54″N 83°5′36.14″W
	1689-007	Seip Earthworks	Bainbridge, Ohio	Large mound 25 ft (7.6 m) in height surrounded by a complex of two circular and one square enclosures. The mound is made up of three sections and is one of the largest Hopewell mounds ever discovered. Numerous artifacts and ceremonial burials were found within the mound. Owned and managed by the National Park Service as a part of Hopewell Culture National Historical Park.	39°14′14.89″N 83°13′11.37″W
	1689-008	Fort Ancient	Oregonia, Ohio	Not a defensive structure despite the name, the site consists of a 3.54 mi (5.7 km) wall surrounding a hilltop surrounded by steep cliffs on all sides. The wall ranges from 4 ft (1.2 m) to 23 ft (7.0 m) in height. Interior walls and gateways divide the site into three separate enclosures. Small burial/ceremonial mounds, and mass graves containing artifacts are located within the enclosure. Although built by the Hopewell, the site was inhabited centuries later by the Fort Ancient culture, who were named after the site. Owned and managed by Ohio History Connection.	39°24′12.1″N 84°5′33.18″W

== See also ==
- Cahokia – Large UNESCO-designated mound complex in Illinois
- Poverty Point – Large UNESCO-designated mound complex in Louisiana
- List of World Heritage Sites in the United States
