= Brad Lepper =

American archaeologist (born 1955)

- Born: Bradley Thomas Lepper; November 19, 1955
- Education: B.A., University of New Mexico; M.A. and Ph.D., Ohio State University
- Known for: Archaeology of Ohio and North America; Earthworks; Ice age peoples.
- Spouse: Karen Richardson Lepper
- Scientific career
- Fields: Archaeology
- Workplaces: Ohio History Connection; Denison University; Ohio State University, Newark Campus
- Thesis: Early Paleo-Indian Land Use Patterns in the Central Muskingum River Basin, Coshocton County, Ohio (1986)
- Doctoral advisor: William S. Dancey

Bradley Thomas Lepper (born November 19, 1955) is an American archaeologist best known for his work on ancient earthworks and ice age peoples in Ohio. Lepper is the senior archaeologist with the World Heritage Program at the Ohio History Connection. He was previously Curator of Archaeology and Manager of Archaeology and Natural History at the Ohio History Connection.

== Background ==
Lepper is a native of Hudson, Ohio, and graduated from Hudson High School in 1974. He has continued to live in Ohio apart from his time at the University of New Mexico, where he received his bachelor's degree after transferring from the University of Akron. Lepper earned his M.A. and Ph.D. degrees at Ohio State University.

== Career ==
Lepper began his career as curator at the Newark Earthworks and Flint Ridge State Memorial after interning with the Ohio Department of Transportation. He is known for the excavation of the Burning Tree mastodon, which took place in December 1989 during expansion of a golf course in Licking County, Ohio, and which eventually resulted in rethinking then-current ideas about mastodons' diets. The story made Discover's top fifty science stories in 1991.

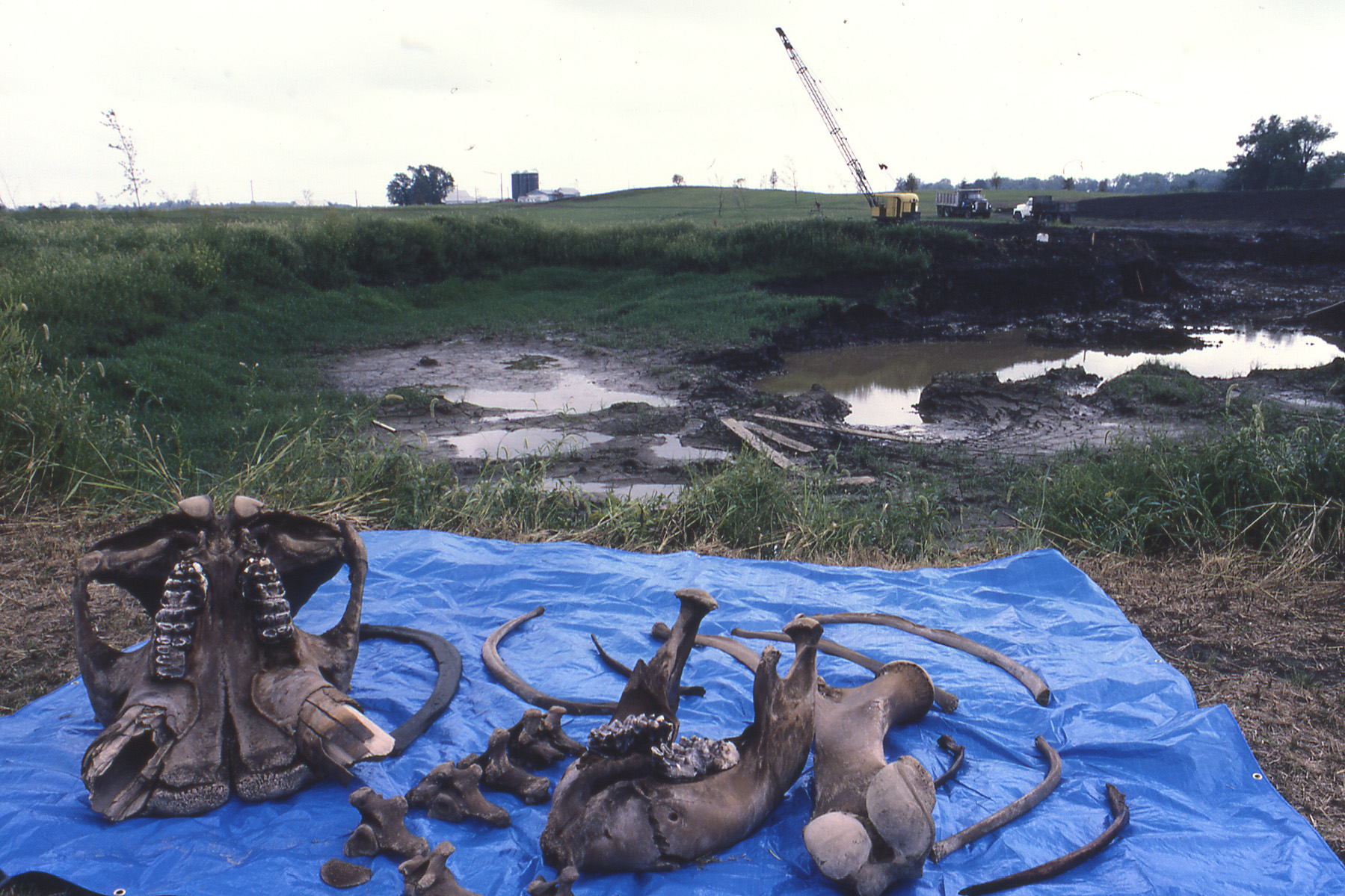
Burning Tree Mastodon excavation site, Burning Tree Golf Course

Lepper is also known for his work on the Great Hopewell Road and Serpent Mound.

== Awards ==
- Society for American Archaeology Book Award (2007, for Ohio Archaeology: An Illustrated Chronicle of Ohio's Ancient American Indian Cultures)
- Ohio Archaeological Council Public Awareness Award (2008)

== Publications ==
- Hooge, Paul; Lepper, Bradley (1992). Vanishing Heritage: Notes and Queries about the Archaeology and Culture History of Licking County, Ohio. Ohio: Licking County Archaeology and Landmarks Society. ISBN 978-0963433107. OCLC 27992155.
- Glotzhober, Robert; Lepper, Bradley (1994). Serpent Mound: Ohio's Enigmatic Effigy Mound. Columbus: Ohio Historical Society. ISBN 978-0877580225. OCLC 31456170.
- Lepper, Bradley (1995). People of the Mounds: Ohio's Hopewell Culture. Columbus: Ohio Historical Society. OCLC 34005808.
- Lepper, Bradley; Yerkes, Richard (1997). "Hopewellian Occupations at the Northern Periphery of the Newark Earthworks: The Newark Expressway Sites Revisited". In Dancey, William; Pacheco, Paul (eds.). Ohio Hopewell Community Organization. Kent: Kent State University Press. pp. 175–206. ISBN 978-0873385619. OCLC 35280493.
- Lepper, Bradley (1998). "The Archaeology of the Newark Earthworks". In Mainfort, Robert; Sullivan, Lynne (eds.). Ancient Earthen Enclosures of the Eastern Woodlands. Gainesville: University Press of Florida. pp. 114–134. ISBN 978-0813015927. OCLC 38425858.
- Lepper, Bradley (1999). "Pleistocene Peoples of Midcontinental North America". In Bonnichsen, Robson; Turnmire, Karen (eds.). Ice Age People of North America. Corvallis: Oregon State University Press. pp. 362–394. ISBN 978-0870714580. OCLC 41231290.
- Lepper, Bradley (2000). "Tracking Ohio's Hopewell Road". In Bayman, James; Stark, Miriam (eds.). Exploring the Past: Readings in Archaeology. Durham: Carolina Academic Press. ISBN 978-0890896990. OCLC 40473702.
- Lepper, Bradley (2002). The Newark Earthworks: A Wonder of the Ancient World. Columbus: Ohio Historical Society. OCLC 82900951.
- Connolly, Robert; Lepper, Bradley, eds. (2004). The Fort Ancient Earthworks: Prehistoric Lifeways of the Hopewell Culture in Southwestern Ohio. Columbus: Ohio Historical Society. ISBN 978-0877580294. OCLC 61197900.
- Lepper, Bradley (2004). "Public Policy, Academic Archaeology, and the First Americans". In Lepper, Bradley; Bonnichsen, Robson (eds.). New Perspectives on the First Americans. College Station: Center for the Study of the First Americans. pp. 203–208. ISBN 9781585443642. OCLC 55516872.
- Lepper, Bradley (2004). "The Newark Earthworks: Monumental Geometry and Astronomy at a Hopewellian Pilgrimage Center". In Sharp, Robert (ed.). Hero, Hawk, and Open Hand: American Indian Art of the Ancient Midwest and South. Chicago: Art Institute of Chicago. pp. 73–82. ISBN 9780300104677. OCLC 56633574.
- Bonnichsen, Robson; Lepper, Bradley (2005). "Changing Perceptions of Paleoamerican Prehistory". In Bonnichsen, Robson (ed.). Paleoamerican Origins: Beyond Clovis. College Station: Center for the Study of the First Americans. pp. 9–22. ISBN 9781585445400. OCLC 61758058.
- Lepper, Bradley (2005). Ohio Archaeology: An Illustrated Chronicle of Ohio's Ancient American Indian Cultures. Wilmington: Orange Frazer Press. ISBN 9781882203390. OCLC 56614293.
- Lepper, Bradley (2006). "The Great Hopewell Road and the Role of the Pilgrimage in the Hopewell Interaction Sphere". In Charles, Douglas; Buikstra, Jane (eds.). Recreating Hopewell. Gainesville: University Press of Florida. pp. 122–133. ISBN 978-0813028989. OCLC 61758660.
- Lepper, Bradley (2010). "The Ceremonial Landscape of the Newark Earthworks and the Raccoon Creek Valley". In Byers, A.; Wymer, DeeAnne (eds.). Hopewell Settlement Patterns, Subsistence, and Symbolic Landscapes. Gainesville: University Press of Florida. pp. 97–127. ISBN 9780813034553. OCLC 437299355.
- Feder, Kenneth; Lepper, Bradley T.; Barnhart, Terry A.; Bolnick, Deborah A. (2011). "Civilizations Lost and Found: Fabricating History Part One: An Alternate Reality". Skeptical Inquirer. 35 (5): 38–45. Archived from the original on 2018-08-26.
- Lepper, Bradley T.; Feder, Kenneth L.; Barnhart, Terry A.; Bolnick, Deborah A. (2011). "Civilizations Lost and Found: Fabricating History Part Two: False Messages in Stone". Skeptical Inquirer. 35 (6): 48–54. Archived from the original on 2018-08-26.
- Bolnick, Deborah A.; Feder, Kenneth L.; Lepper, Bradley T.; Barnhart, Terry A. (2012). "Civilizations Lost and Found: Fabricating History Part Three: Real Messages in DNA". Skeptical Inquirer. 36 (1): 48–51. Archived from the original on 2018-08-26.
- Lepper, Bradley T.; Duncan, James R.; Diaz-Granádos, Carol; Frolking, Tod A. (2018). "Arguments for the Age of Serpent Mound". Cambridge Archaeological Journal. 28 (3): 433–450.
- Barnes, Benjamin J.; Lepper, Bradley T. (2018). "Drums Along the Scioto: Interpreting Hopewell Material Culture Through the Lens of Contemporary American Indian Ceremonial Practices". Archaeologies. 14 (1): 62–84.
- Bush, Jennifer; Kocher, Reba; Lepper, Bradley T. (2022). "The Newark Holy Stones: Touchstones for The Truth". The Public Historian. 44 (1): 78–93.
