= Fort Ancient (Lebanon, Ohio) =

Coordinates: 39°24′28.02″N 84°05′24.91″W

- U.S. National Register of Historic Places
- U.S. National Historic Landmark
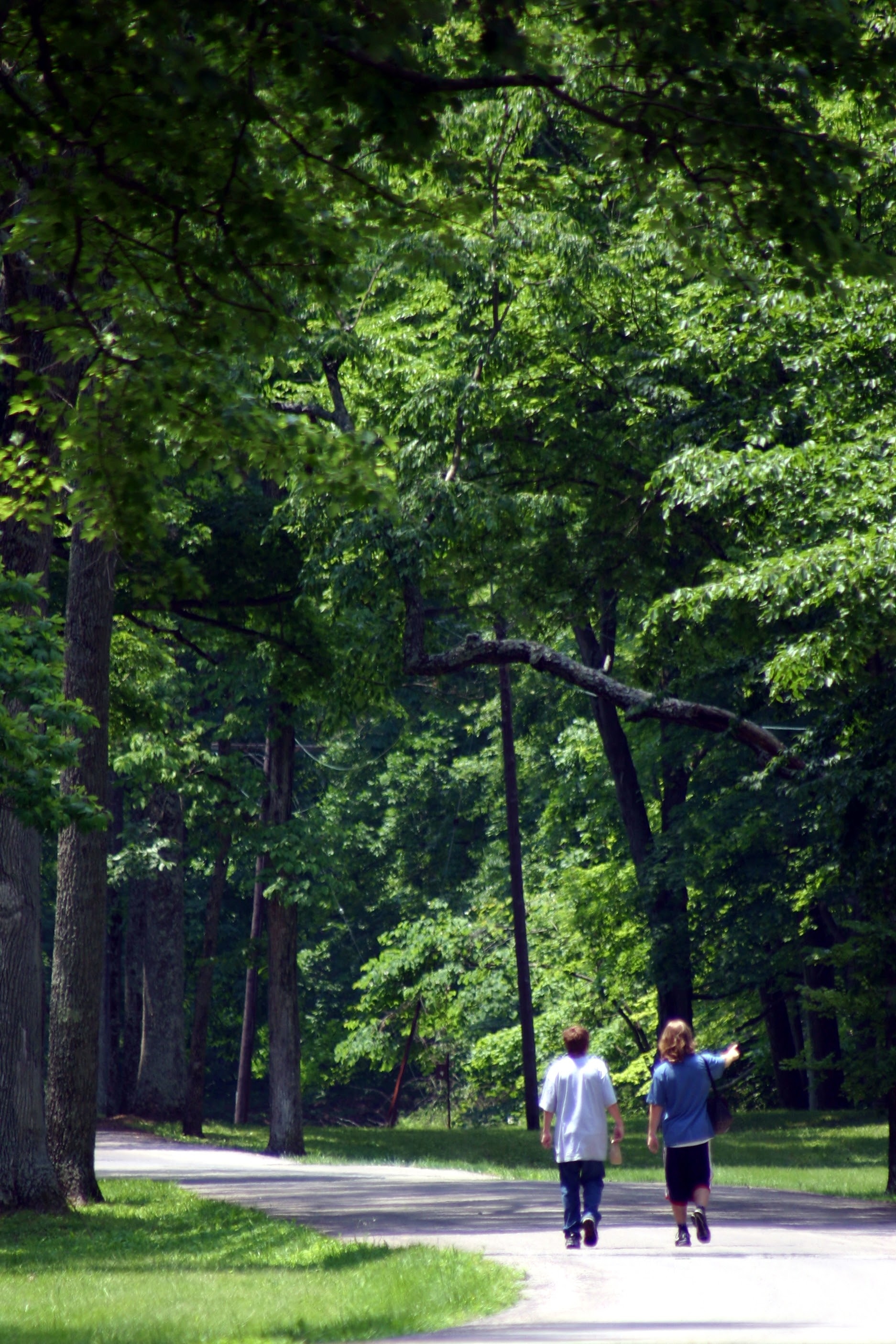
- Nearly two miles of trails wind through Fort Ancient State Memorial's 764 acres (3.09 km^{2})

- Location within Ohio Location within the United States
- Nearest city: Lebanon, Ohio
- NRHP reference No.: 66000625
- Added to NRHP: October 15, 1966

Fort Ancient (33 WA 2) is a Native American earthworks complex located in Washington Township, Warren County, Ohio, along the eastern shore of the Little Miami River about seven miles (11 km) southeast of Lebanon on State Route 350. The site is the largest prehistoric hilltop enclosure in the United States with three and one-half miles (18,000 ft) of walls in a 100-acre (0.40 km^{2}) complex. Built by the Hopewell culture, who lived in the area from the 200 BC to AD 400, the site is situated on a wooded bluff 270 feet (82 m) above the Little Miami. It is the namesake of a culture known as Fort Ancient who lived near the complex long after it was constructed.

Maintained as a state historical park, the site was designated a National Historic Landmark for its significance. The State of Ohio purchased the land and made it Ohio's first state park in 1891. In addition, this is part of the Hopewell Ceremonial Earthworks, one of 14 sites nominated in January 2008 by the U.S. Department of the Interior for potential submission by the United States to the UNESCO World Heritage List. It was officially designated a World Heritage Site in September 2023 together with the earthworks at Hopewell Culture National Historical Park and the Newark Earthworks. Fort Ancient is owned and operated by the Ohio History Connection.

== Construction ==
The Fort Ancient earthworks were built in at least three stages over an estimated 400-year period. The shoulder blades of deer, split elk antlers, clam shell hoes, and digging sticks were used to loosen the dirt, and baskets holding 35 to 40 pounds were used to carry and distribute the soils in building the earthworks. Archaeologists estimate the total volume of earth in the walls at 553,000 cubic yards (423,000 m^{3}).

== Archaeological research ==
In 1809 the Philadelphia Port Folio published the first map and description of Fort Ancient. The accounts of the site by Atwater and Warden several years later are nearly identical to the 1809 report and map. The site was visited and surveyed in by John Locke in 1843. In Edwin Hamilton Davis and Ephraim George Squier's Ancient Monuments of the Mississippi Valley, they described Fort Ancient as "one of the most extensive, if not the most extensive, work...in the entire West", regarding its size. Warren K. Moorehead conducted some of the initial excavations at Fort Ancient in 1887 and published his research in 1891 in the book Fort Ancient: Great Prehistoric Warren County Ohio. Additional research was conducted by William C. Mills in 1908 and Richard Morgan and Holmes Ellis in 1939–1940.

More contemporary research includes the following:

- From 1982 until her untimely death in 1991, Patricia Essenpreis conducted a series of excavations that included the re-excavation and examination of embankment wall cuts conducted by Richard Morgan. These excavations demonstrated that the embankment walls were built in multiple stages and that post structures were documented at the base of the walls. She also examined the Gateway 13 exterior spur where she found evidence of bladelet manufacturing. Her final project involved the excavation of a pavement and structure on the exterior of the earthworks near the Twin Mound complex. Here, she documented a three-level limestone pavement with household or domestic activity at the lowest level.
- From 1987 through 2006, Robert Connolly collaborated with and then continued the research projects initiated by Patricia Essenpreis. His initial work involved taking Essenpreis's "canons of construction" to develop an "architectural grammar" of earthwork elements, demonstrating their intentional and precise placement throughout the Fort Ancient complex. In 1995 and 1996 Connolly directed the investigation of embankment walls and a large interior space of the North Fort of the earthwork in advance of a new museum construction. The embankment wall excavation confirmed Essenpreis' conclusion of multiple construction levels, but added a level of complexity in alternate basket loads of different soils in the construction, many features below the embankment wall, and a three-level limestone pavement on the exterior of the wall that contained a cache of burnt animal bones. Excavation in the North Fort interior space revealed the presence of 10 habitation structures.
- Beginning in 2006, Robert Riordan conducted excavations in the North Fort of the earthwork complex that revealed a complex series of posts and activity areas, some with intense burning. Riordan named the Moorehead Circle after the archaeologist who conducted early excavations at the site.

== Purpose ==
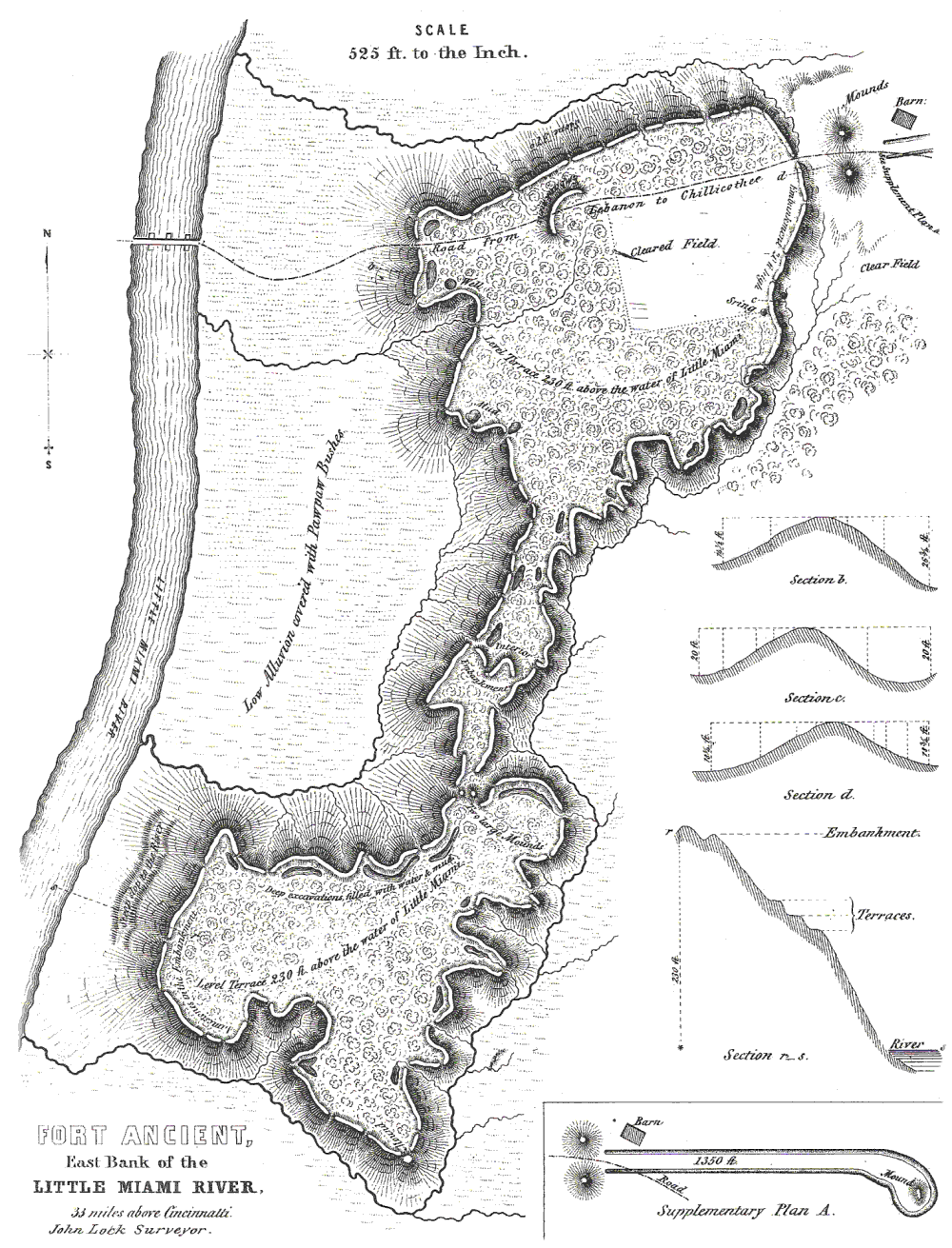
1843 Map of the earthworks at Fort Ancient included in Ancient Monuments of the Mississippi Valley.

Some archaeologists originally thought the site was created to provide shelter against enemies. However, that interpretation is now discounted as the site presents anomalies inconsistent with defensive use such as:

- Ditches are located inside the walls, rather than outside as a means of defense.
- The 84 gateway openings in the walls could not have been defended in case of attack.
- Evidence has not been found for the number of occupants necessary for a significant defense force.

Based on the total corpus of archaeological research, the current functional interpretation is that the walls were designed for social, economic, political and ceremonial purposes. Research demonstrates the site architecture was aligned with significant astronomical events. In the Northeast corner of the complex, four circular stone-covered mounds are arranged in a square. The southwest mound of the four is interpreted to have functioned as a point that aligned with gateway openings in the embankment walls to mark significant solar and lunar events.

== Museum ==
The site now includes a 9,000-square-foot (840 m^{2}) museum covering 1500 years of American Indian heritage in the Ohio Valley. Topics include North America's earliest people, the development of agriculture, and the impact of Europeans who migrated to the area and came into conflict with the Native Americans then living in region. The Museum also contains a classroom, a research area, and a gift shop. The site is open to the public Wednesday-Saturday from 10:00 AM to 5:00 PM and Sunday 12:00 - 5:00 PM ..

== The Historic Era Fort Ancient Village ==
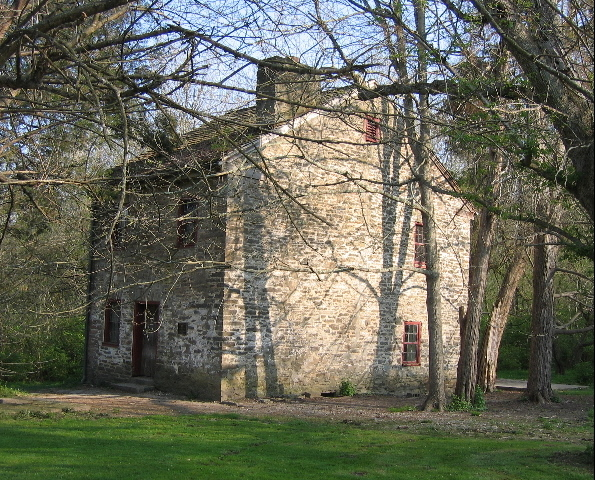
Stone building from 1802 operated as the Cross Keys Tavern from 1809-1820

In the 1800s to early 1900s a village existed on the eastern bank of the Little Miami River, at the base of the Fort Ancient Earthworks. The village once had a post office (1846), hotel, blacksmith shop and other businesses and residences. The village no longer exists, but is currently the home of a canoe livery and a private campground.

In the 19th century, Fort Ancient was a stop on the Little Miami Railroad. A historic tavern called the Crossed Keys Tavern remains on the west bank of the Little Miami River and is listed on the National Register of Historic Places. The area is currently a public access to the Little Miami Bike Trail, which occupies the former railway land that follows the River. There is a public access and parking for the Little Miami River at the site.

== See also ==
- Moorehead Circle
- List of Registered Historic Places in Warren County, Ohio
- Fort Ancient Culture
- List of Hopewell sites
