= Hopewell Culture National Historical Park =

United States national historical park

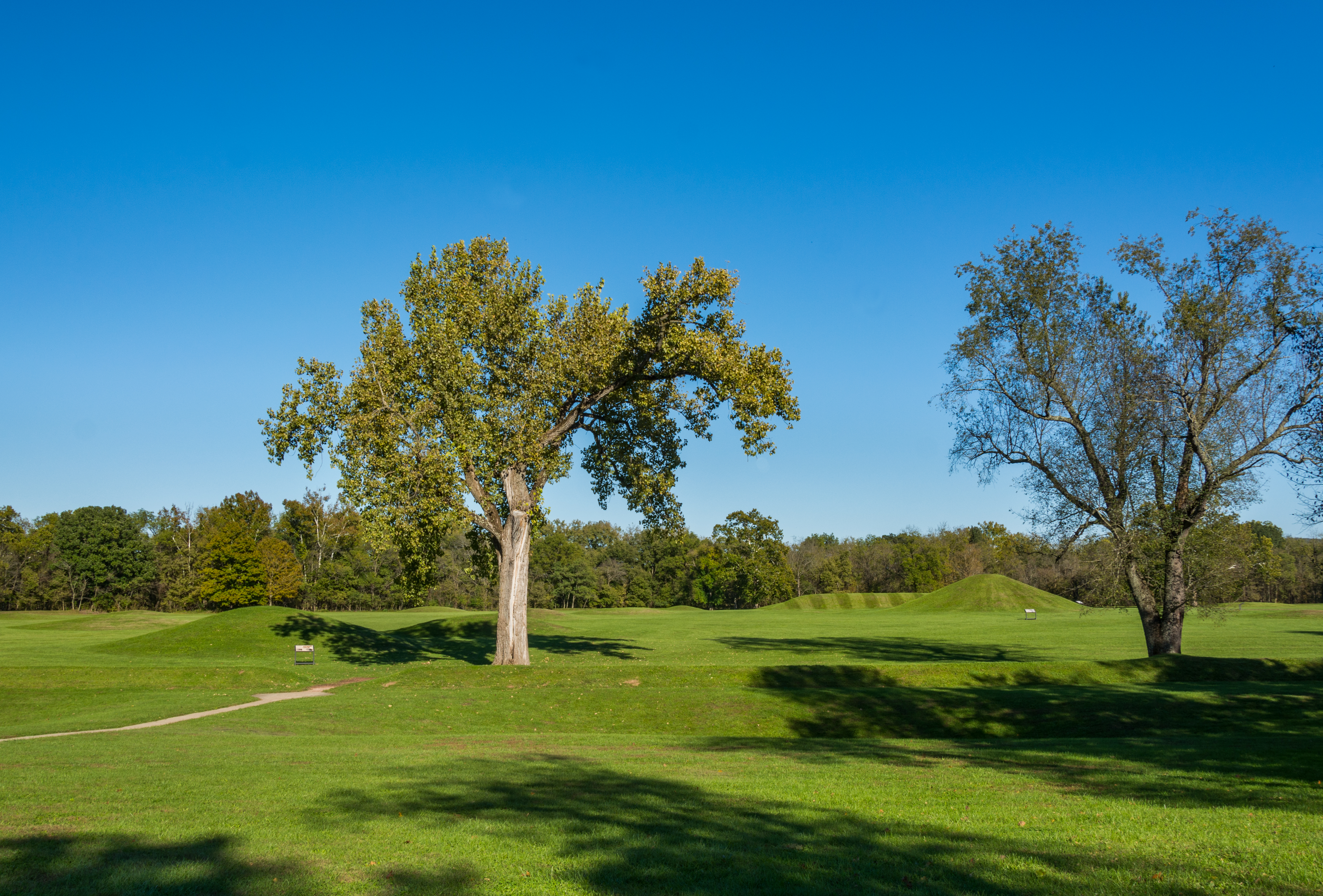
- Restored mounds in the Hopewell Culture NHP

- Location within Ohio Location within the United States
- Location: Ross County, Ohio, United States
- Nearest city: Chillicothe, Ohio
- Coordinates: 39°22′33″N 83°00′23″W
- Area: 1,170 acres (4.7 km^{2})
- Established: March 2, 1923
- Visitors: 51,969 (in 2025)
- Governing body: National Park Service
- Website: Hopewell Culture National Historical Park

UNESCO World Heritage Site
- Part of: Hopewell Ceremonial Earthworks
- Criteria: Cultural: i, iii
- Reference: 1689-004
- Inscription: 2023 (45th Session)
- Area: 320.7 ha (792 acres)
- Buffer zone: 561.8 ha (1,388 acres)

Hopewell Culture National Historical Park is a United States national historical park with earthworks and burial mounds from the Hopewell culture, indigenous peoples who flourished from about 200 BC to 500 AD. The park is composed of four separate sites open to the public in Ross County, Ohio, including the former Mound City Group National Monument. The park includes archaeological resources of the Hopewell culture. It is administered by the United States Department of the Interior's National Park Service. It was designated a part of Hopewell Ceremonial Earthworks World Heritage Site in 2023.

== Location ==
Hopewell Culture National Historical Park consists of six geographically separated units open to the public.

=== Mound City Group ===
Mound City enclosure, Hopewell Culture National Historical Park. The 13-acre square enclosure contains 23 burial mounds of the Hopewell culture (100 BCE – 500 CE).

Mound City Group is the site of the visitor center and the only fully restored Hopewell site. It is located at 16062 State Route 104 in Chillicothe. The group is surrounded by a 1.2-metre (3 ft 11 in) roughly square earthen wall. It includes 25 mounds, most of which are conical or spherical; one mound is a larger ellipse, and two of the circular mounds overlap.

=== Seip Earthworks ===
Seip Mound, one of the largest Hopewell burial mounds ever excavated, within the Seip Earthworks complex.

Seip Earthworks is a group of geometric earthworks located at 7078 U.S. Route 50 in Bainbridge. It consists of a large circle with a 494-metre (1,621 ft) diameter, a smaller circle with a 289-metre (948 ft) diameter, and a square with 329-metre (1,079 ft) sides. The site is one of five complexes in the Chillicothe area that include the same geometric elements, suggesting that they were constructed according to shared plans.

=== Hopewell Mound Group ===
Hopewell Mound Group is a 300-acre (120 ha) site located at 4731 Sulphur Lick Road in Chillicothe. The site includes 29 mounds and is the type site for the Hopewell culture, which is named after former landowner M. Cloud Hopewell. The largest of the mounds is also the largest known Hopewell mound; it consists of three conjoined circles and is 500 feet (150 m) long. A semicircular earthwork encloses that mound and an additional four mounds.

=== Hopeton Earthworks ===
Hopeton Earthworks is a group of geometric earthworks located at 990 Hopeton Road in Chillicothe. The site includes a circle with a 320-metre (1,050 ft) diameter, a similarly sized square, a pair of parallel earthen lines, and multiple smaller circles. The circle has the same diameter as those at four other geometric Hopewell culture sites, and the parallel lines follow the sun's path on the winter solstice.

=== Spruce Hill Earthworks ===
Spruce Hill Earthworks is located on a hill overlooking Paint Creek. The site is enclosed by a stone wall, unlike the earthen walls surrounding most Hopewell sites. The enclosure has four entry points and was likely used for group ceremonies.

=== High Bank Works ===
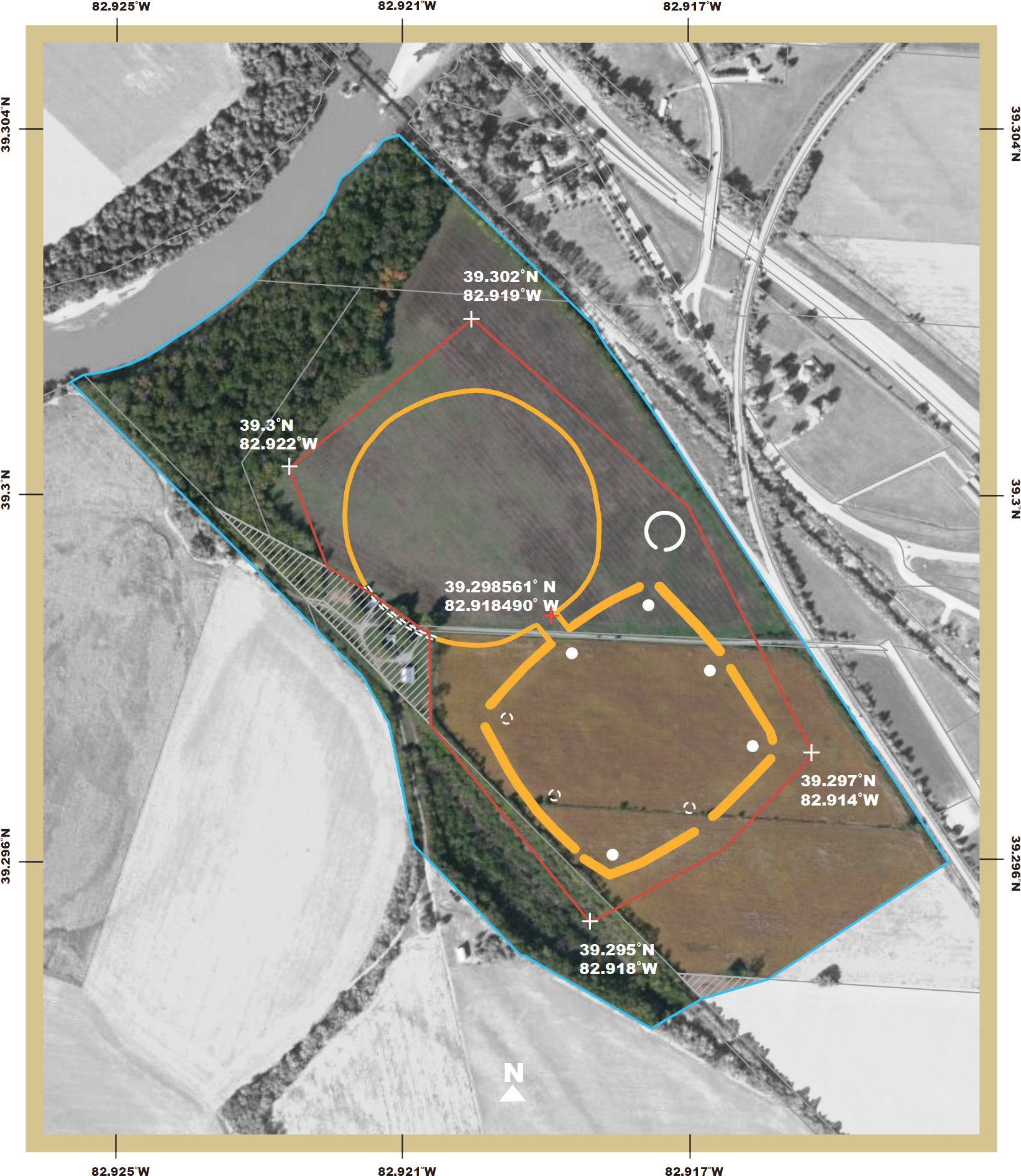
High Bank Works

High Bank Works is a group of geometric earthworks along the Scioto River. The site includes a large circle and octagon, each roughly 1,000 feet (300 m) across, along with many smaller structures. The structures line up with the sun's path on both solstices as well as the moon's path during the lunar standstill cycle, suggesting the Hopewell people had advanced knowledge of astronomy. The site is currently closed to the public.

== History ==
=== Hopewell culture ===
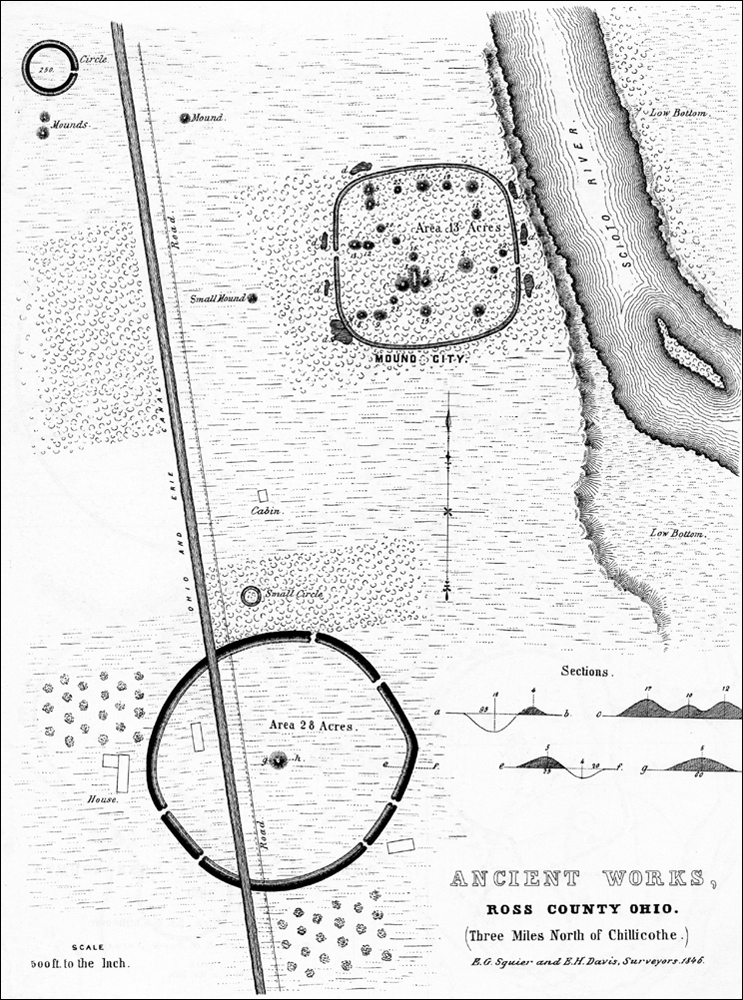
1840s map of Mound City

From about 200 BC to AD 500, the Ohio River Valley was a central area of the prehistoric Hopewell culture. The term Hopewell (taken from the land owner who owned the land where one of the mound complexes was located) culture is applied to a broad network of beliefs and practices among different Native American peoples who inhabited a large portion of eastern North America. The culture is characterized by its construction of enclosures made of earthen walls, often built in geometric patterns, and mounds of various shapes. Visible remnants of Hopewell culture are concentrated in the Scioto River valley near present-day Chillicothe, Ohio.

The most striking Hopewell sites contain earthworks in the form of squares, circles, and other geometric shapes. Many of these sites were built to a monumental scale, with earthen walls up to 12 feet (3.7 m) high outlining geometric figures more than 1,000 feet (300 m) across. Conical and loaf-shaped earthen mounds up to 30 feet (10 m) high are often found in association with the geometric earthworks. The people who built them had a detailed knowledge of the local soils, and they combined different types to provide the most stability to the works. It required the organized labor of thousands of man hours, as people carried the earth in handwoven baskets.

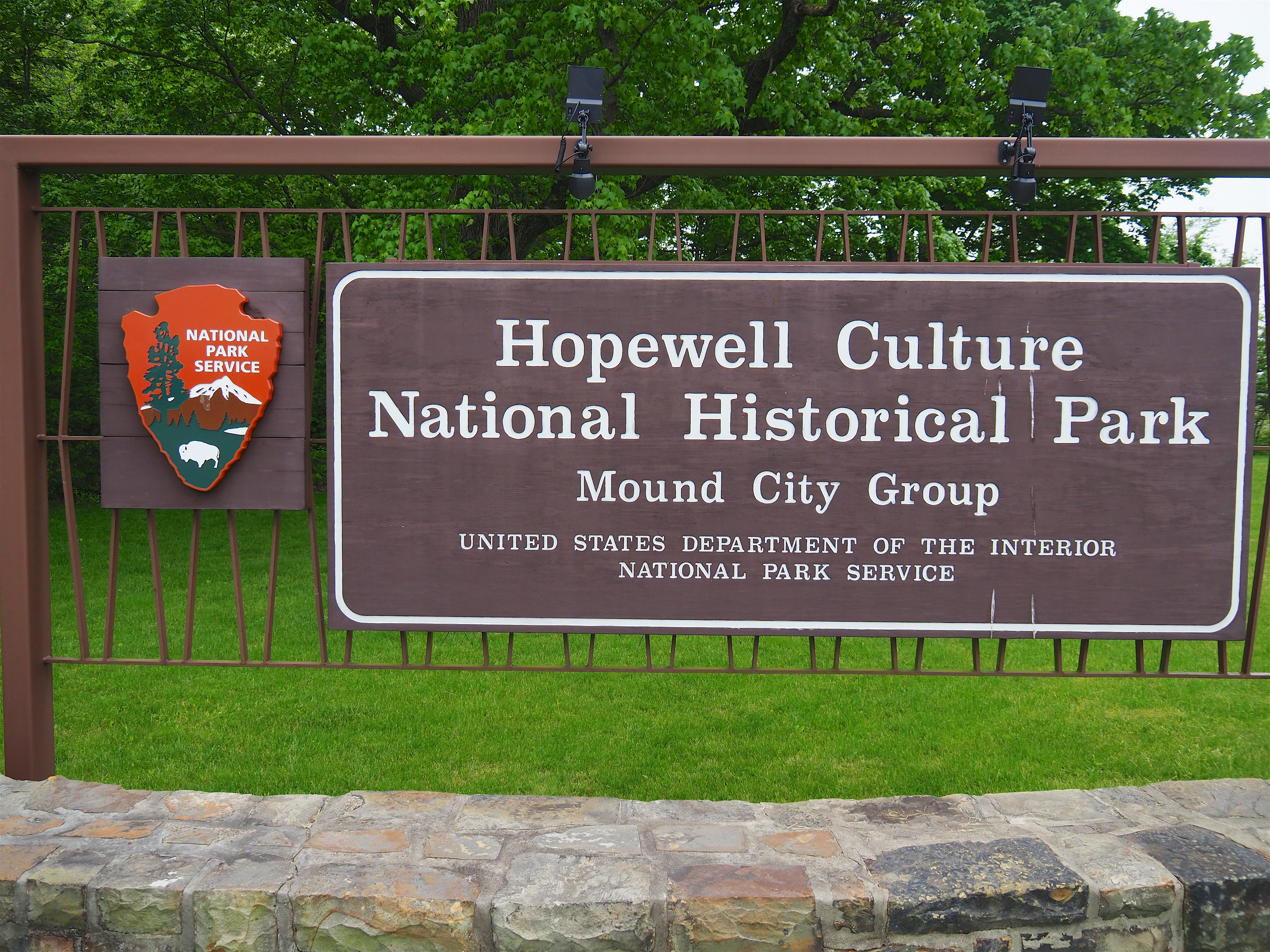
Entry sign at Hopewell Culture National Historical Park

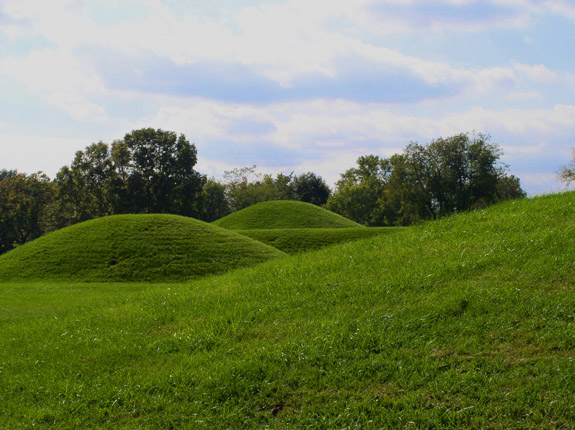
Mound City Site

Mound City, located on Ohio Highway 104 approximately 4 miles (6 km) north of Chillicothe along the Scioto River, is a group of 23 earthen mounds constructed by the Hopewell culture. Each mound within the group covered the remains of a charnel house. After the Hopewell people cremated the dead, they burned the charnel house. They constructed a mound over the remains. They also placed artifacts, such as copper figures, mica, projectile points, shells, and pipes in the mounds.

=== Discovery and protection ===
European Americans first mapped the site in the 1840s. The archaeologists Ephraim George Squier and Edwin Hamilton Davis were the first excavators of the site and amassed a large collection of Mound artifacts that is now preserved at the British Museum. Much of it was destroyed during World War I when the United States Army constructed a military training base, Camp Sherman, on the site. After the war, they razed the camp. The Ohio Historical Society conducted an archaeological excavation of the site from 1920 to 1922, followed by reconstruction of the mounds. In 1923, the Department of Interior declared the Mound City Group a National Monument, to be administered by the Federal government.

In 1992, Mound City Group was renamed and expanded as Hopewell Culture National Historical Park. Its definition included remnants of four other nearby earthwork and mound systems. Two Ross County sites are within a few miles of Mound City and open to the public. Seip Earthworks is located 17 miles (27 km) west of Chillicothe on U.S. Route 50. Hopewell Mound Group is the site of the 1891 excavation on the land of Mordecai Hopewell (for whom the culture is named). Hopeton Earthworks is located across the Scioto River from Mound City and High Bank Works, which is closed to the public.

The Ohio History Connection also maintains a number of mound systems and elaborate earthworks in the southern Ohio area, including the National Historic Landmarks of Fort Ancient, Newark Earthworks, and Serpent Mound. Fifteen mound complexes earlier identified in the county have been lost to agriculture or urban development.

The national park contains nationally significant archaeological resources, including large earthwork and mound complexes. These provide insight into the sophisticated and complex social, ceremonial, political, and economic life of the Hopewell people.

The park visitor center features an orientation film, book sales area, and self-guided tours.

== See also ==
- Hopewell Ceremonial Earthworks World Heritage Site
- List of Hopewell sites
