= Newark Earthworks =

Archaeological site in Ohio, United States

- U.S. National Register of Historic Places
- U.S. National Historic Landmark
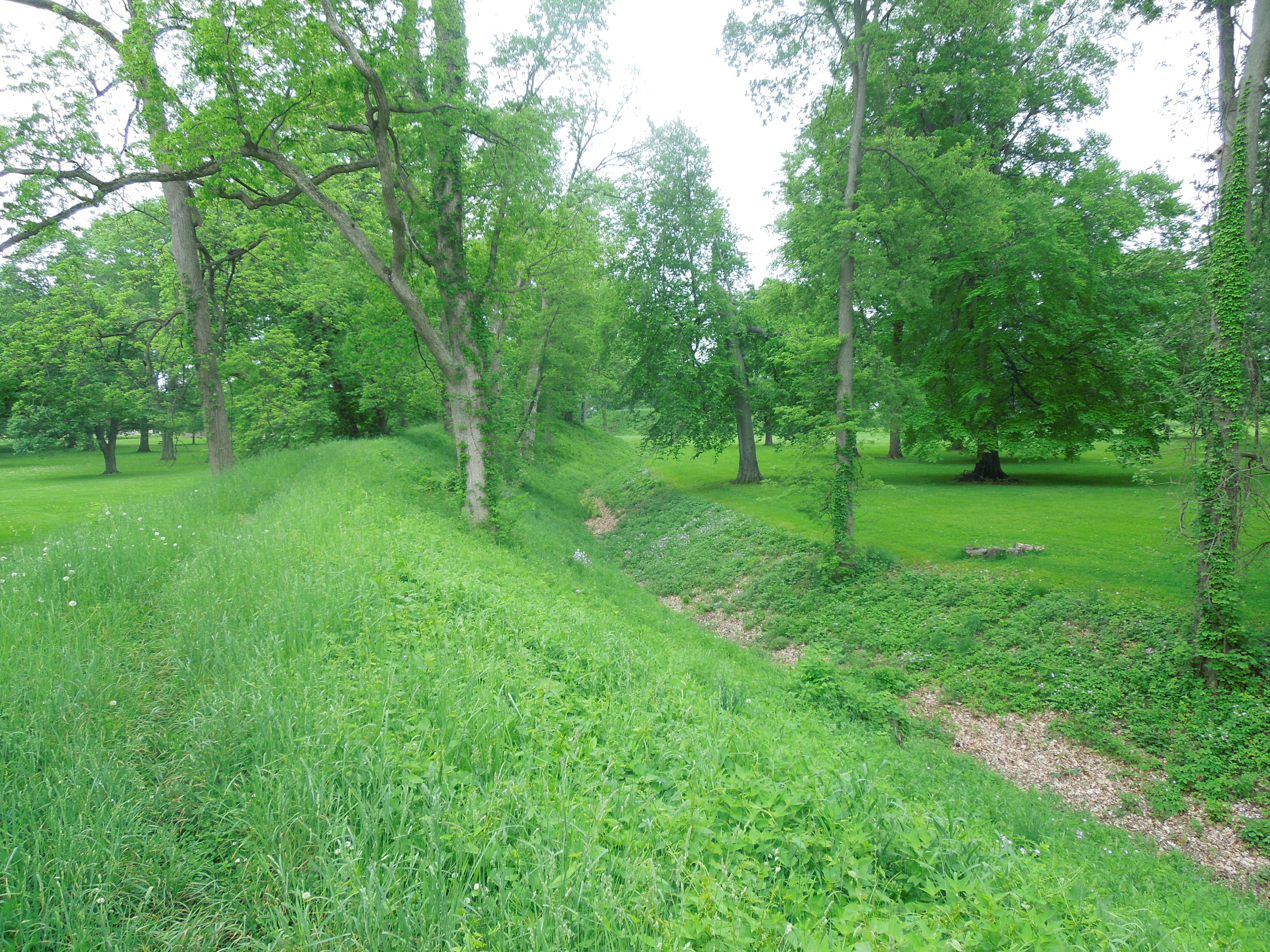
- View along the main wall and the moat from the outside the Great Circle. The break in the wall - the traditional entrance - is visible in the far distance.

- Location within Ohio Location within the United States
- Location: Roughly bounded by Union, 30th, James, and Waldo streets, and OH 16, Newark, Ohio
- Coordinates: 40°2′31.8″N 82°25′48.4″W
- Area: 190 acres (77 ha) (landmarked area)
- Architectural style: Hopewell culture
- NRHP reference No.: 66000614

Significant dates
- Added to NRHP: October 10, 1966
- Designated NHL: July 19, 1964

The Newark Earthworks in Newark and Heath, Ohio, consist of three sections of preserved earthworks: the Great Circle Earthworks, the Octagon Earthworks, and the Wright Earthworks. This complex, built by the Hopewell culture between 100 BCE and 400 CE, contains the largest earthen enclosures in the world, and was about 3,000 acres (1,200 ha) in total extent. Less than 10 percent of the total site has been preserved since European-American settlement; this area contains a total of 206 acres (83 ha). Newark's Octagon and Great Circle Earthworks are managed by the Ohio History Connection. A designated National Historic Landmark, in 2006 the Newark Earthworks was also designated as the "official prehistoric monument of the State of Ohio."

This is part of the Hopewell Ceremonial Earthworks, one of 14 sites nominated in January 2008 by the U.S. Department of the Interior for potential submission by the United States to the UNESCO World Heritage List. It was officially designated a World Heritage Site in September 2023 together with the earthworks at Hopewell Culture National Historical Park and Fort Ancient.

== History ==
Built by the Hopewell culture between 100 BCE and 400 CE, the earthworks were used by the indigenous Native Americans as places of ceremony, social gathering, trade, worship, and honoring the dead. The primary purpose of the Octagon earthwork was believed to have been scientific. Scholars have demonstrated that the Octagon Earthworks comprise a lunar observatory for tracking the Moon's orbit during its 18.6-year cycle.

While limited, the Newark Earthwork site is the largest surviving Hopewell earthwork complex in North America. The culture built many earthen mounds. Over decades, they built what is the single largest earthwork enclosure complex in the Ohio River Valley.

The complex was one of hundreds of Native American ancient monuments identified and surveyed for the Smithsonian Institution in the mid-nineteenth century by Ephraim G. Squier and Edwin Hamilton Davis, from 1837 to 1847. The work that was published by a nascent Smithsonian Institution was titled Ancient Monuments of the Mississippi Valley. This study of the prehistoric Mound Builders of North America was a landmark in American scientific research and the early development of archaeology as a scientific discipline. The book was the first volume of the Smithsonian Institution's Contributions to Knowledge series and the Institution's first publication. Squier and Davis' detailed and measured plan of the site is shown on this page.

== Great Circle Earthworks ==
Gateway entrance to the Great Circle Earthworks, Newark, Ohio. The circular enclosure measures 1,200 feet in diameter with walls up to 14 feet high.

Interior of the Great Circle Earthworks looking toward the interior wall, Newark, Ohio. The enclosure was used for large-scale ceremonial gathering by the Hopewell culture (100 BCE – 500 CE).

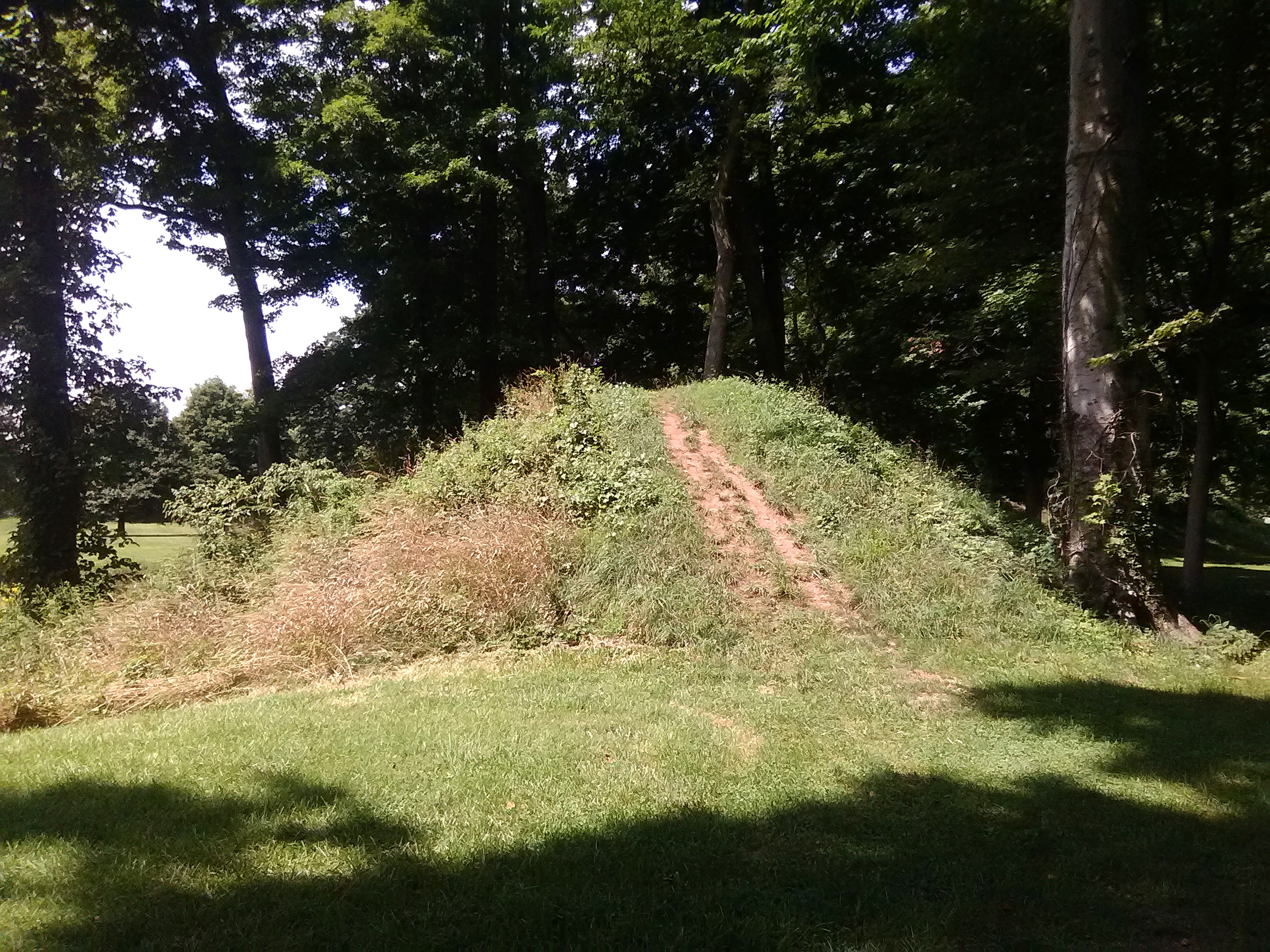
A mound in the Great Circle Earthworks

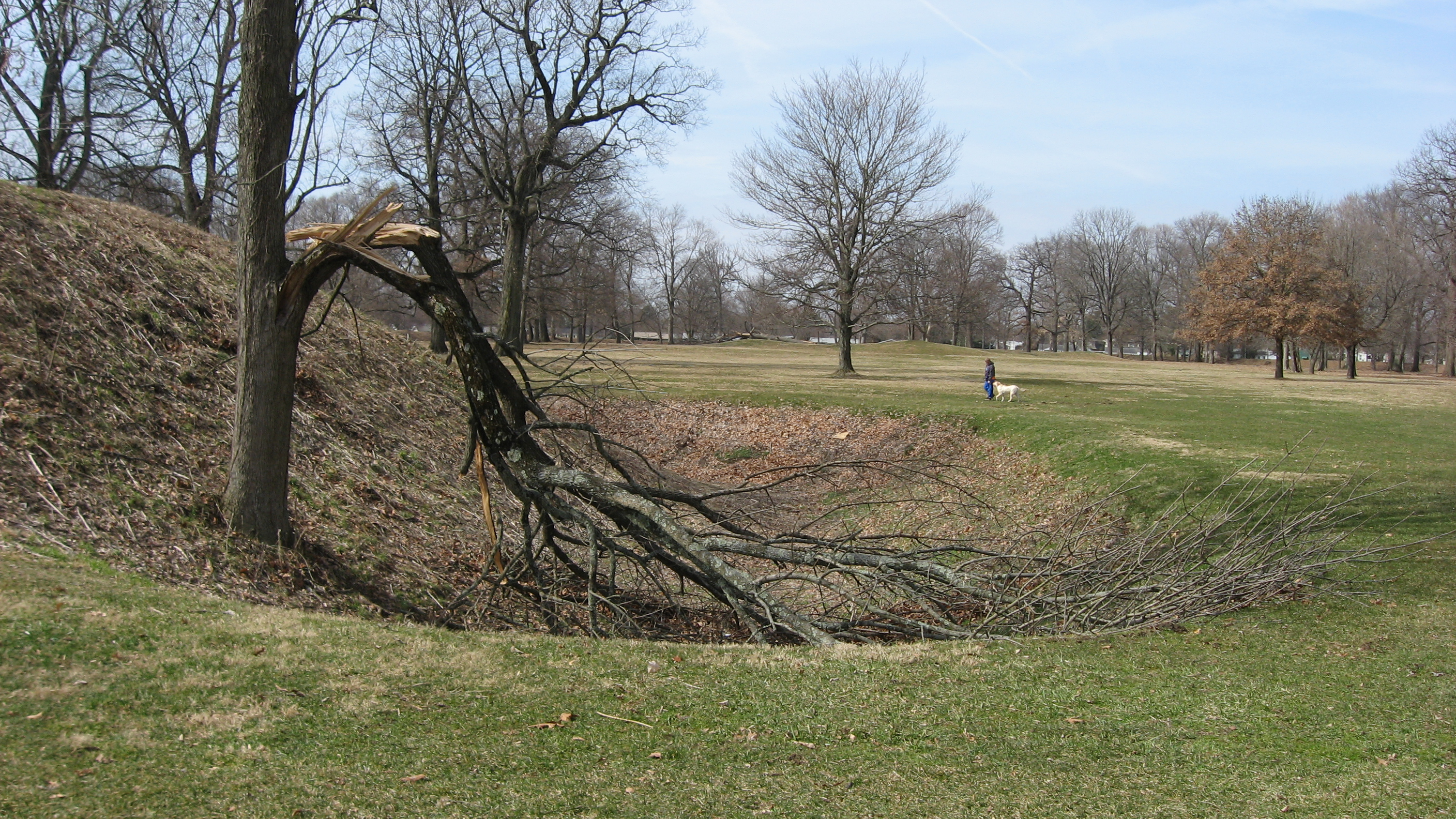
One end of the Great Circle Earthworks, part of the Newark Earthworks.

The 1,200-foot (370 m)-wide Newark Earthworks Great Circle (located in Heath, OH) is one of the largest circular earthworks in the Americas, at least in construction effort. A 5-foot (1.5 m) deep moat is encompassed by walls that are 8 feet (2.4 m) high; at the entrance, the dimensions are even more grand.

Eagle Mound, the central mound within the Great Circle Earthworks, Newark, Ohio.

At the Center of the Crate Circle Earthwork sits Eagle Mound, which was named by early settlers who believed its shape resembled an eagle in flight. Archaeological excavations conducted in 1928 by Emerson Greenman on Eagle Mound determined that it was not a burial mound. Instead, Eagle Mound had been constructed over a rectangular, multi-post building with a central hearth and screening fence arranged in a T shaped manner. The building appears to have been ceremonially decommissioned consistent with Hopewell practices before Eagle Mound was constructed over it.

== Octagon Earthworks ==
The Octagon Earthworks, aligned to the 18.6-year lunar standstill cycle, Newark, Ohio. Part of the Hopewell Ceremonial Earthworks UNESCO World Heritage Site.

The Octagon Earthworks consists of an Observatory Mound (connected at the southwestern edge of Observatory Circle), Observatory Circle 20 acres (8 ha), and the connected Octagon 50 acres (20 ha). The Octagon has eight 550-foot (170 m)-long walls, from 5 feet (1.5 m) to 6 feet (1.8 m) high. The Octagon is joined by parallel walls to Observatory Circle .

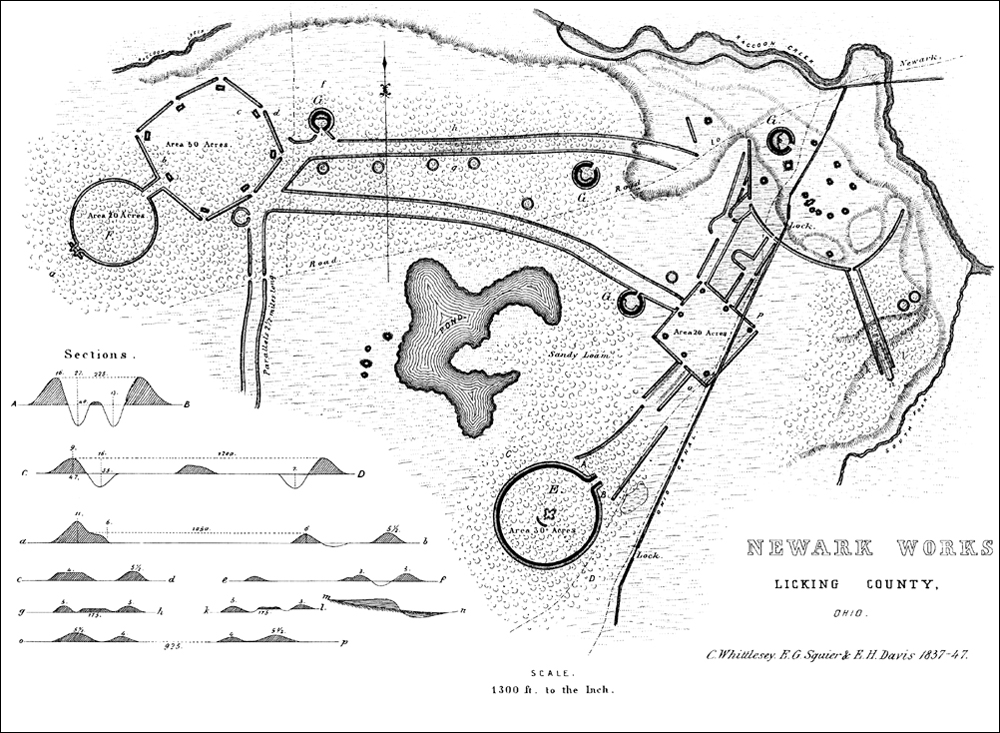
19th-century plan of the Works

From 1892 to 1908, the state of Ohio used the Octagon Earthworks as a militia encampment. Immediately after this, the Newark Board of Trade owned the property, until 1918. In 1910, the property was leased to Moundbuilders Country Club (MBCC), which developed the site as a golf course. As a result of a Licking County Common Pleas Court case, a trustee was named to manage the property from 1918 to 1933.

In 1982 researchers from Earlham College in Richmond, Indiana concluded that the complex was a lunar observatory, designed to track motions of the moon, including the northernmost point of the 18.6-year cycle of the lunar orbit. When viewed from the observatory mound, the moon rises at that time within one-half of a degree of the octagon's exact center. The earthwork is twice as precise as the complex at Stonehenge (assuming Stonehenge is an observatory, which is a disputed theory).

In 1997 the Ohio Historical Society (now the Ohio History Connection) signed a lease until 2078 with the country club. MBCC maintains, secures, and provides restricted public access to the land. Some citizens believe the country club is an inappropriate use of the sacred site. There has been increasing public interest in the earthworks. Activists have pressed for more public access to the site to witness the moonrise, which observance was planned in the design and construction by the original native builders.

In 2022 the Ohio Supreme Court had ruled that the historical society could use eminent domain to buy out the lease from the Moundbuilders Country Club. On August 2024 a deal was reached and the Country Club left from the site on 1 January 2025.

== Wright Square ==
The Wright Square was a geometrically near-perfect 20 acres square enclosure with walls averaging 931 feet (284 m) in length. Much of the square enclosure was destroyed during the nineteenth-century by -the development the surrounding city of Newark. Construction related to building the Ohio Canal, along with cultivation of fields for farming also destroyed much of the monument. What remains of Wright Square is a segment of wall and a segment of parallel wall that led to what would have been the Cherry Valley Ellipse. The Wright Square is named for Mrs. Frances Rees Wright, who donated the site in 1934 to the Ohio Historical Society

== Gallery ==
Color photos are of the Great Circle, located in Heath. The black-and-white photos of the Octagon Earthworks in Newark were taken from the air in the 1980s, showing the interposition of country club golf sand traps and greens with the surviving parts of the ancient circles, walls, Observatory Circle and Octagon.

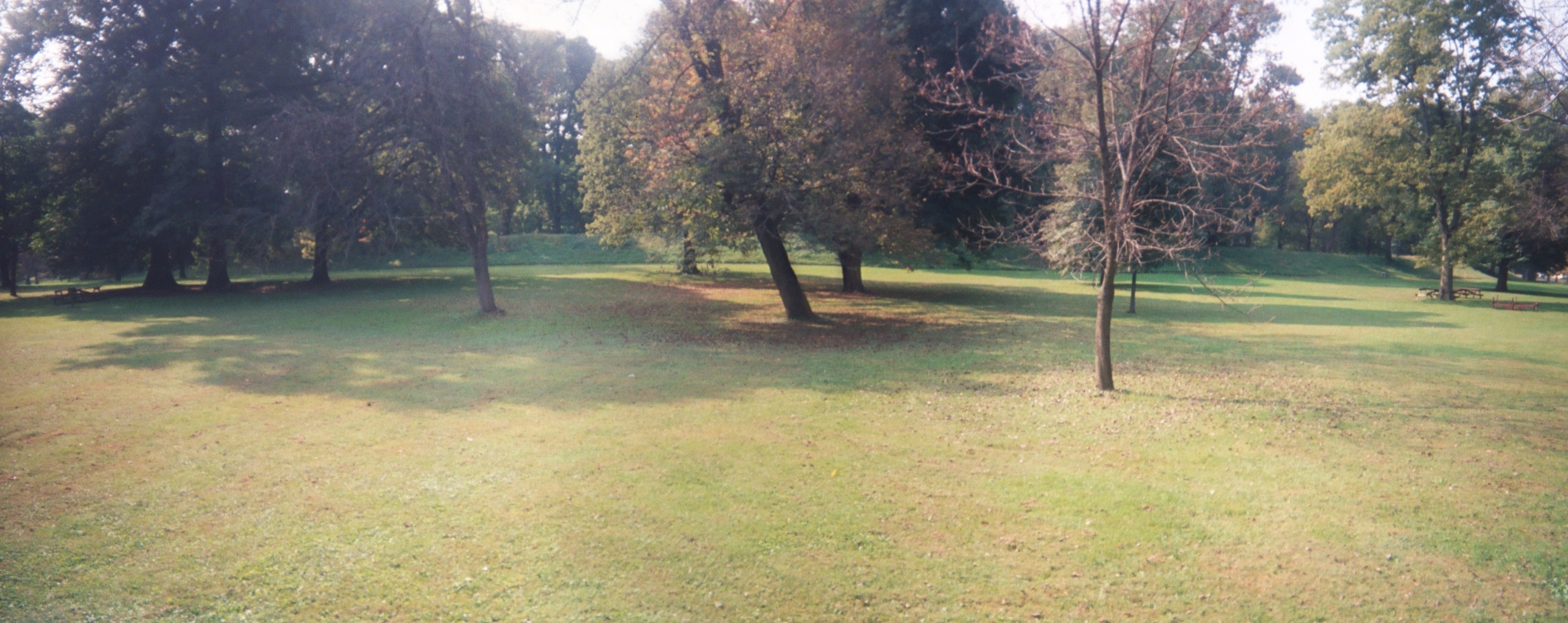
Panoramic view from within the Great Circle, the wall of which can be seen in the background.

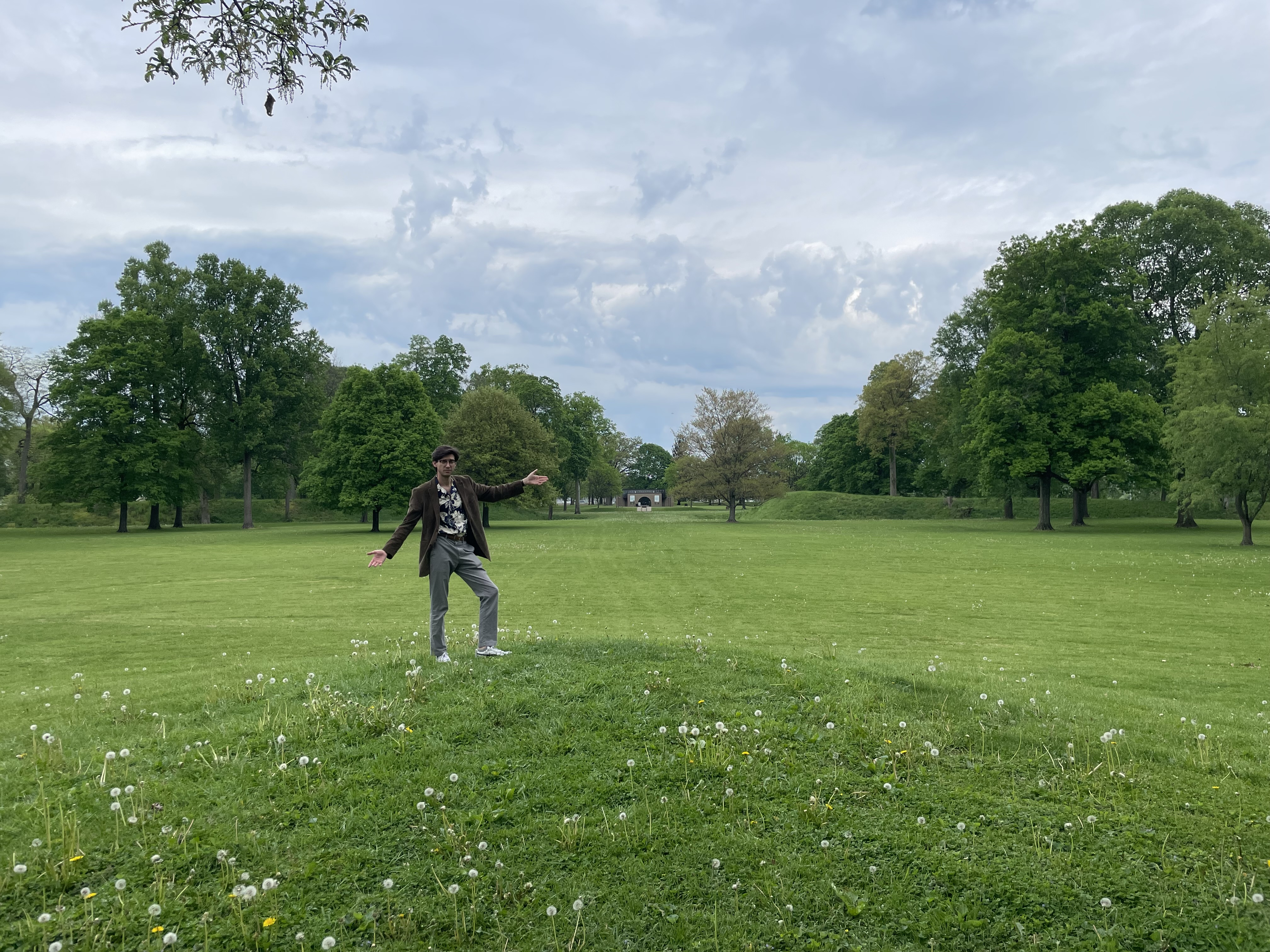
Man on top of the central mound at the Great Circle in 2024

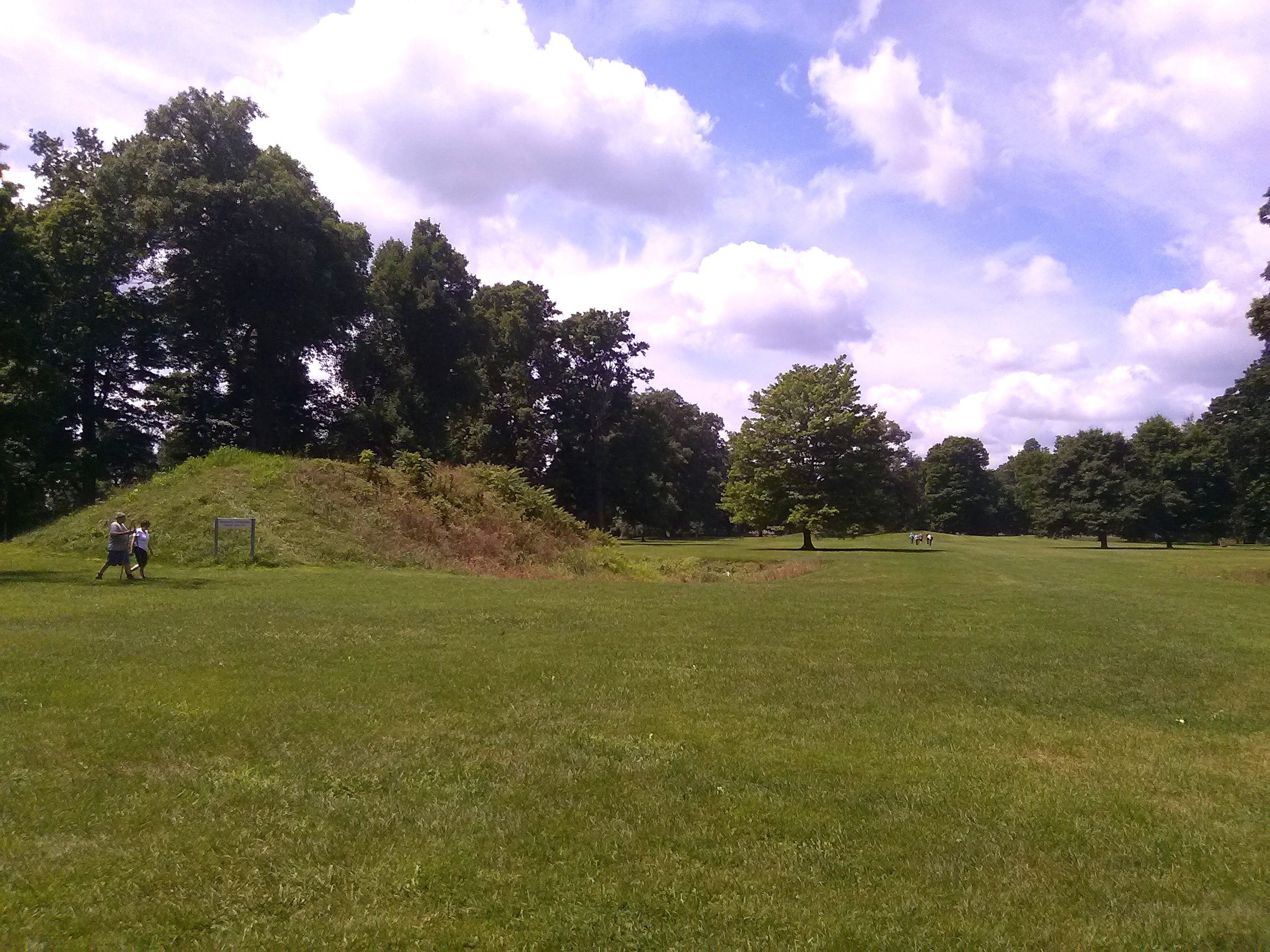
Tourists at Great Circle Earthworks, Heath

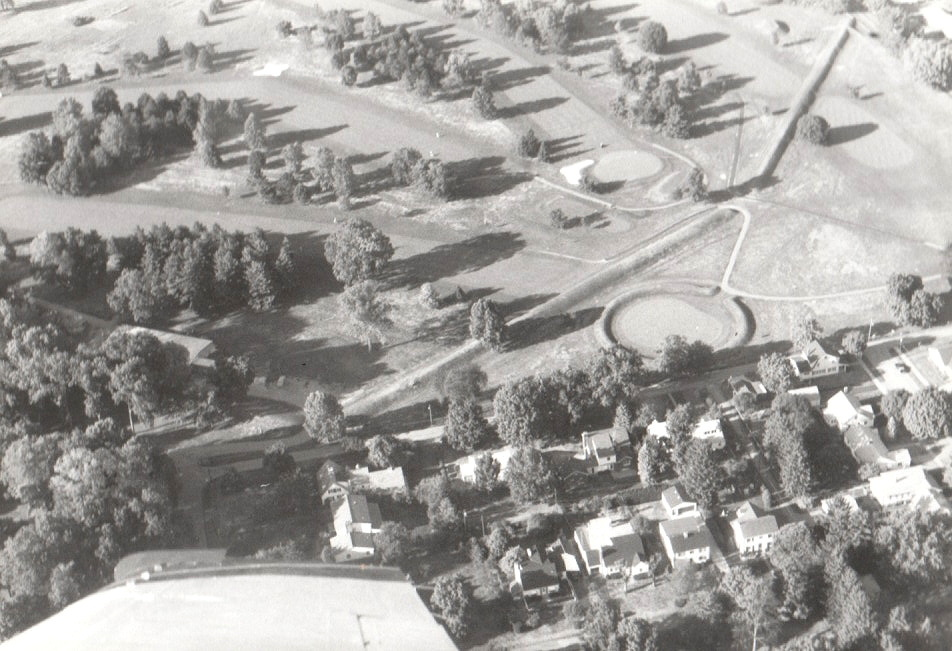
Octagon Earthworks, Newark - small ancient walled circle

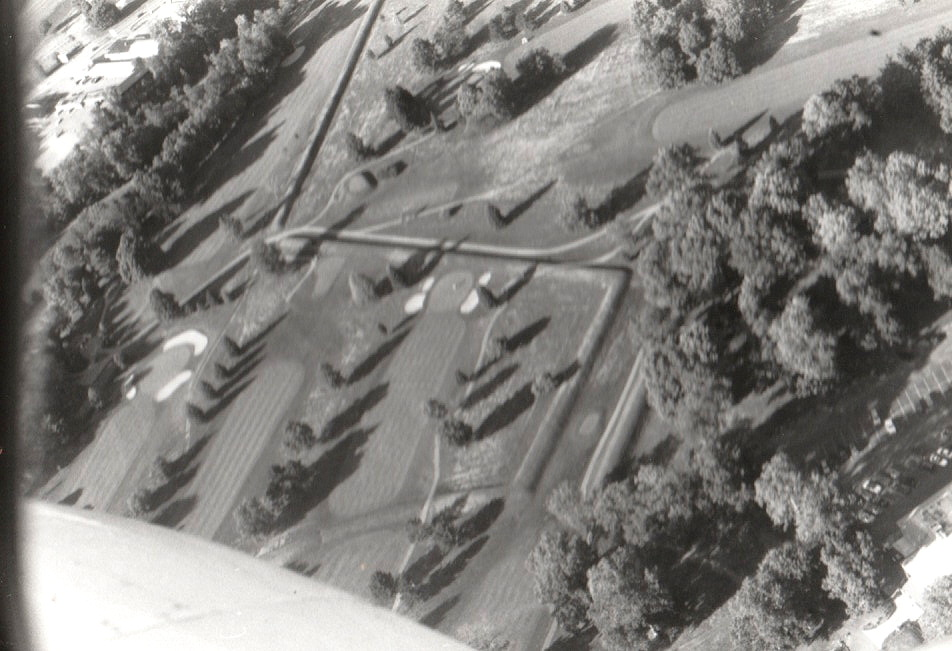
Octagon Earthworks - walls of ancient causeway

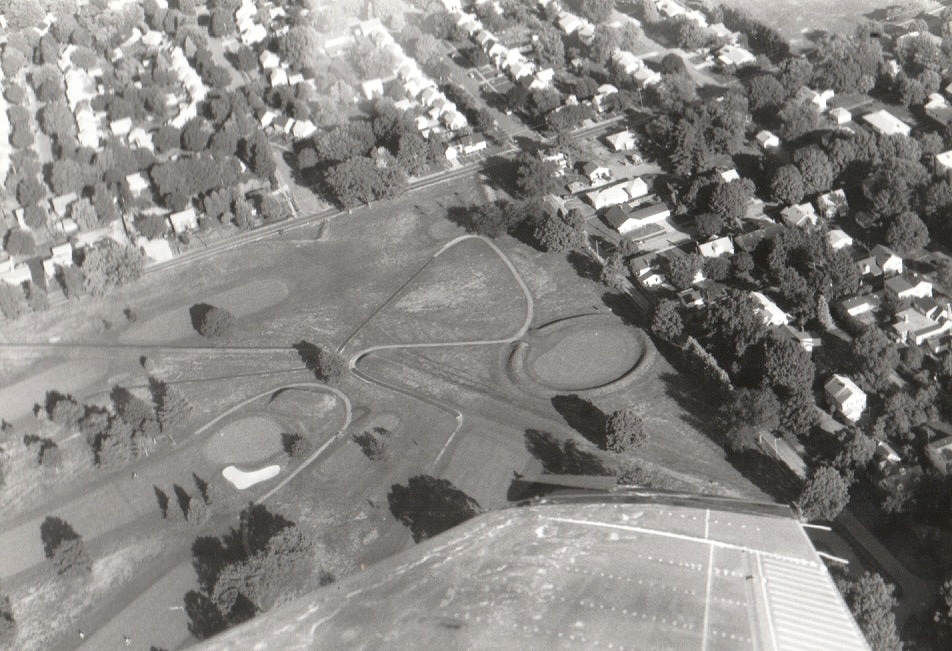
Octagon Earthworks - small ancient circle and other walls

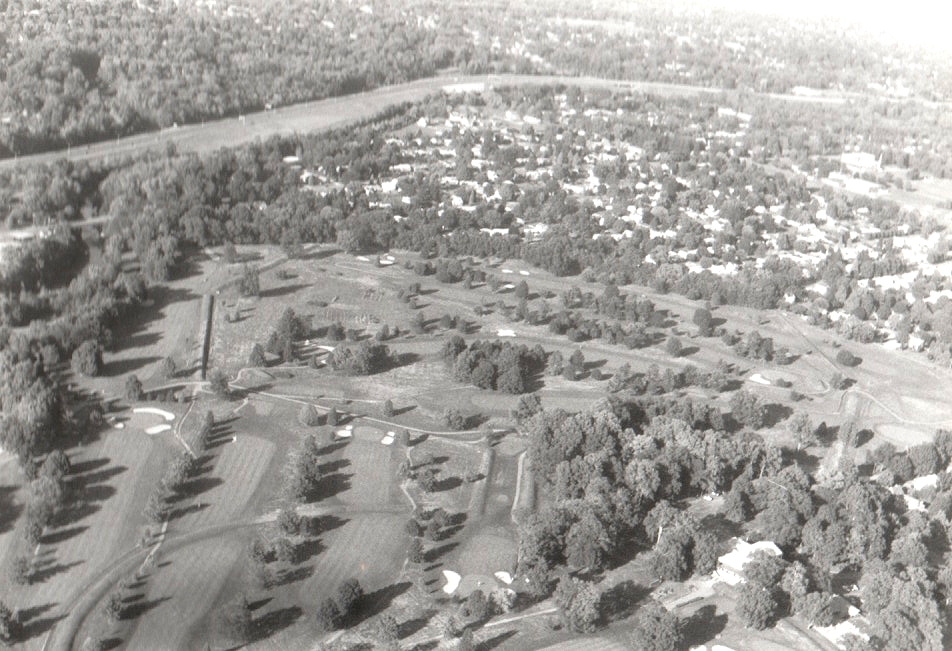
Octagon Earthworks

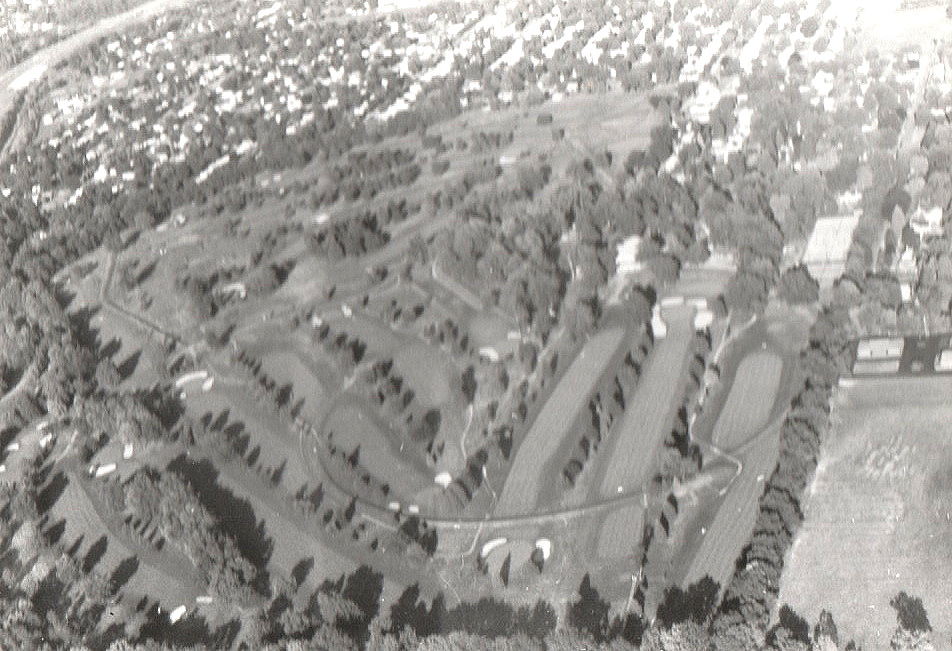
Octagon Earthworks - Observatory Circle in lower right; part of straight walls of Octagon in left center

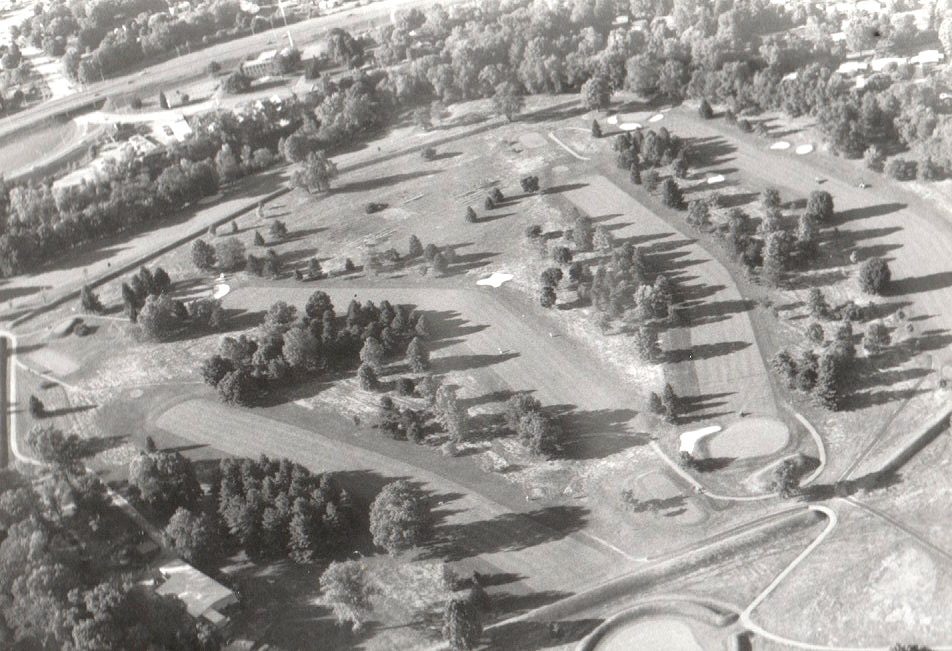
Octagon Earthworks

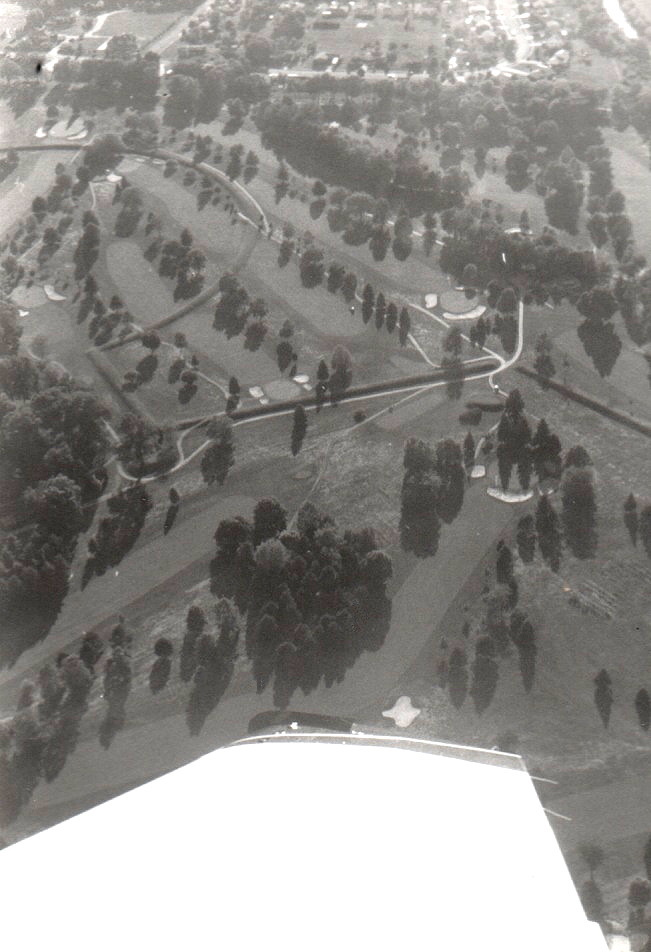
Octagon Earthworks

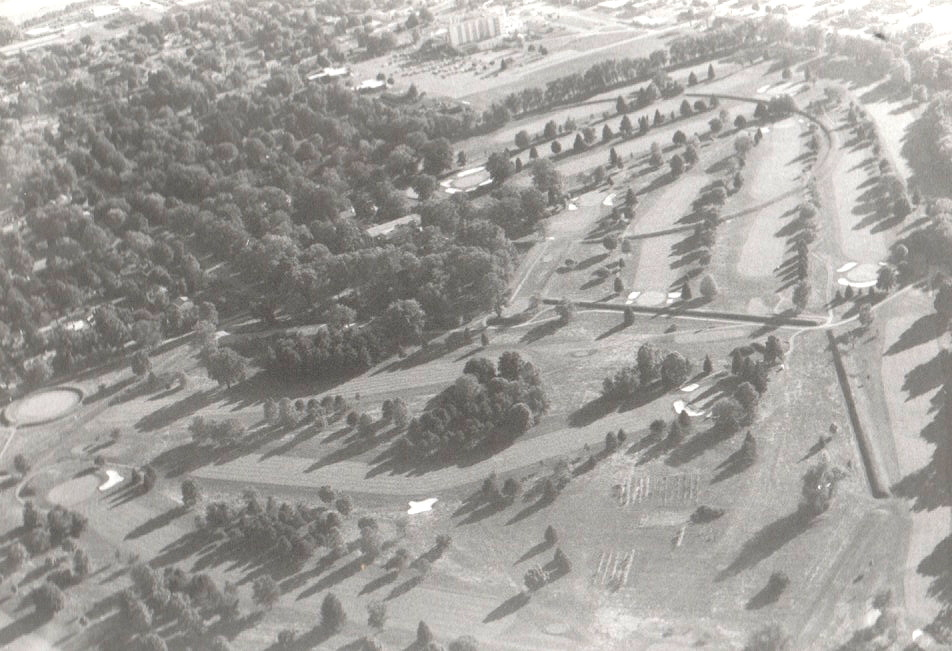
Octagon Earthworks - Observatory Circle in upper right, and part of Octagon visible below that after short causeway

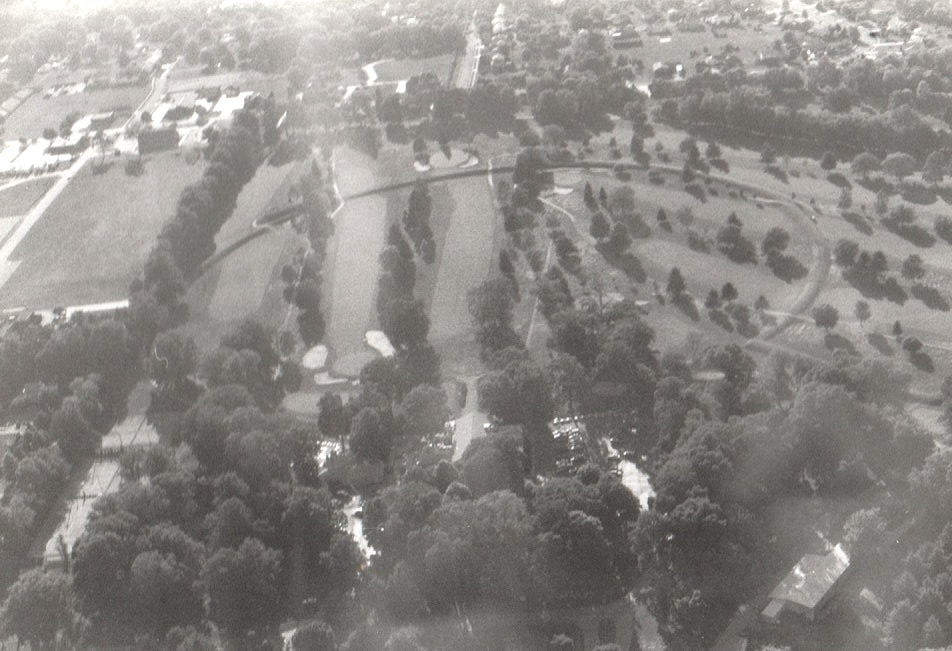
Octagon Earthworks - walls of Observatory Circle

== See also ==
- Earthwork (archaeology)
- Fort Ancient
- Hopewell Ceremonial Earthworks
- Hopewell Culture National Historical Park
- List of Hopewell sites
- Mound builder (people)
- List of National Historic Landmarks in Ohio
- National Register of Historic Places listings in Licking County, Ohio
