= Hopeton Earthworks =

- U.S. National Register of Historic Places
- U.S. National Historic Landmark
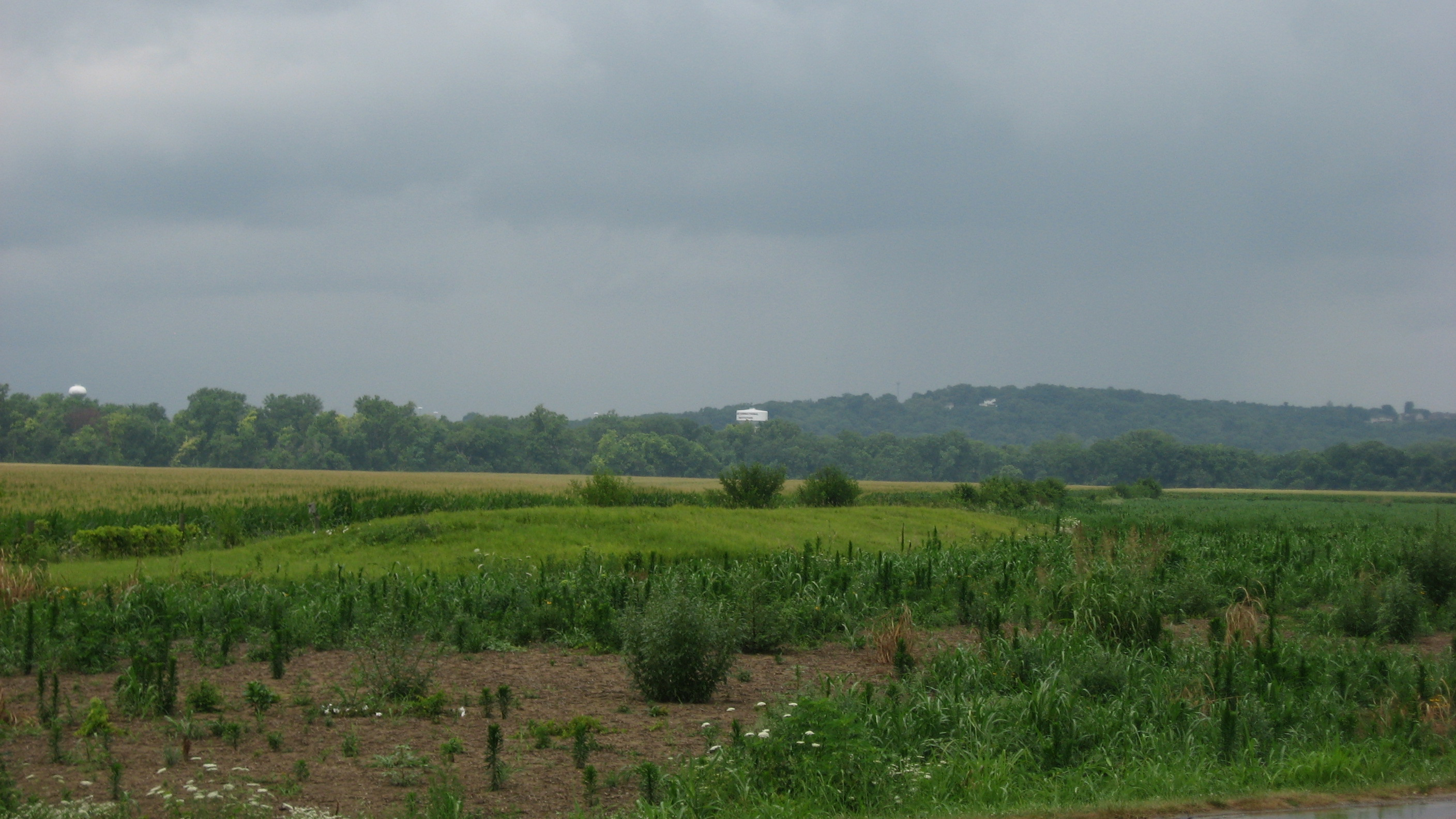
- One of the few remaining walls

- Location within Ohio Location within the United States
- Nearest city: Hopetown, Ohio
- Coordinates: 39.38357°N 82.97904°W
- NRHP reference No.: 66000623

Significant dates
- Added to NRHP: October 15, 1966 (59 years ago)
- Designated NHL: July 19, 1964 (62 years ago)

The Hopeton Earthworks are an Ohio Hopewell culture archaeological site consisting of mounds and earthwork enclosures. It is located on the eastern bank of the Scioto River just north of Chillicothe in Ross County, Ohio, about 1 mile (1.6 km) east of the Mound City Group and Shriver Circle on a terrace of the Scioto River. The site is a detached portion of the Hopewell Culture National Historic Park, along with the Mound City Group, Hopewell Mound Group, Seip Earthworks, Spruce Hill Earthworks, and the High Bank Works. The site is open to the public.

== Survey history ==
=== Squier and Davis: 1846 ===
Ephraim George Squier and Edwin Hamilton Davis visited the site in 1846. They would discuss their findings from surveying Hopeton in their 1848 book, Ancient Monuments of the Mississippi Valley. They describe the site as consisting of main works with a set of smaller works to the right of the main. There is a rectangle shaped work "with an attached circle, the latter extending into the former, instead of being connected with it in the usual manner." The circle is located "somewhat to the right of a line drawn through the centre of the rectangle, parallel to its longest sides." The rectangle site was surveyed at 950 feet (290 m) by 900 feet (270 m) in size. The attached circle was noted at 1,050 feet (320 m) in diameter.

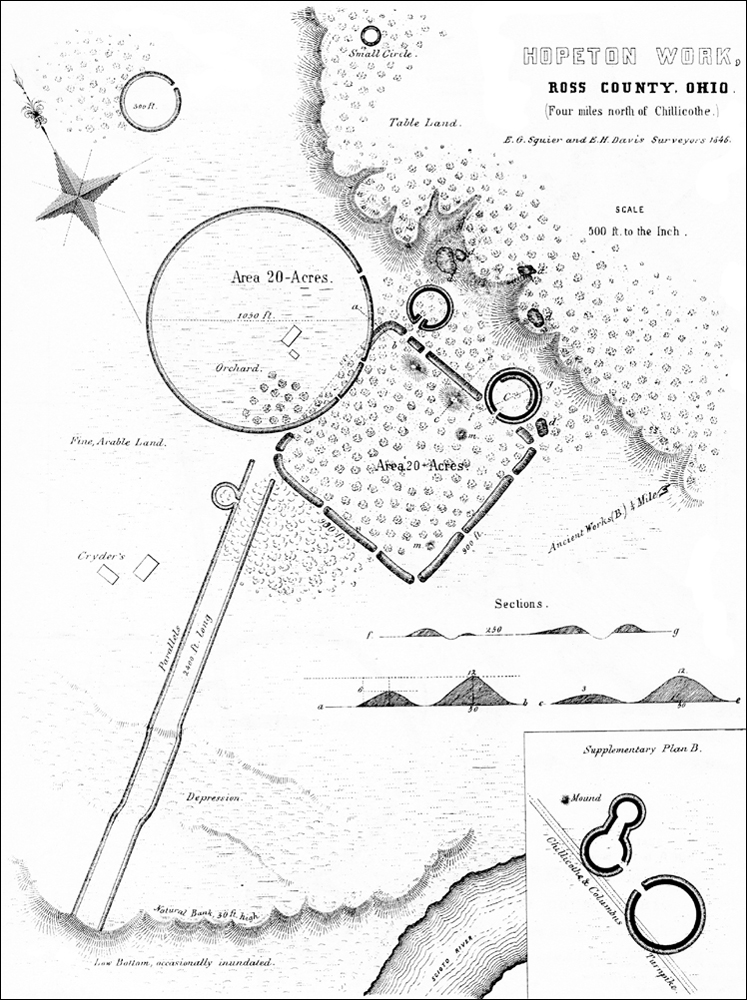
19th-century plan of the Works from Ancient Monuments of the Mississippi Valley.

The site was reported as having 12 gateways, averaging 25 feet (7.6 m) in width. The "line" going from the circle to the rectangle was 530 feet (160 m) long. The east side of the earthworks were reported as having two more circles. One was measured at 200 feet (61 m) and the other at 250 feet (76 m) in diameter. Another small circle is located just north of the site, also noted at 250 feet (76 m) in diameter.

The walls are loam. They were reported as being 12 feet (3.7 m) high and 50 feet (15 m) at the base. Unlike many other earthworks, there is no ditch on either side of the walls. Squier and Davis were impressed by the size of the walls, stating that "they resemble the heavy grading of a railway, and are broad enough, on the top, to admit the passage of a coach." The circle walls are shorter than the rectangle walls, and Squier and Davis believed this to be due to farming. They noted that the clay used to build the circle was different colors than the earth the earthworks were built upon.

Squier and Davis surveyed that parallel walls traveled from the northwestern corner of the rectangle to the river it the southwest. They did not believe that these walls were directly connected to the main works of the site. The walls were marked as being 24 feet (7.3 m) long and 150 feet (46 m) apart. They end at "the edge of the terrace", where the "river once had its course". Both are described as being straight in design. They noted that excavations throughout the area, one is a large hole, others were random removals of soil, but not enough removed to have created the earthworks. No large mounds were found at the time of excavation, but two small oval shaped elevations were discovered. There were also two small mounds in the rectangle.

After their survey, Squier and Davis concluded that the site was used as a fortification.

== See also ==
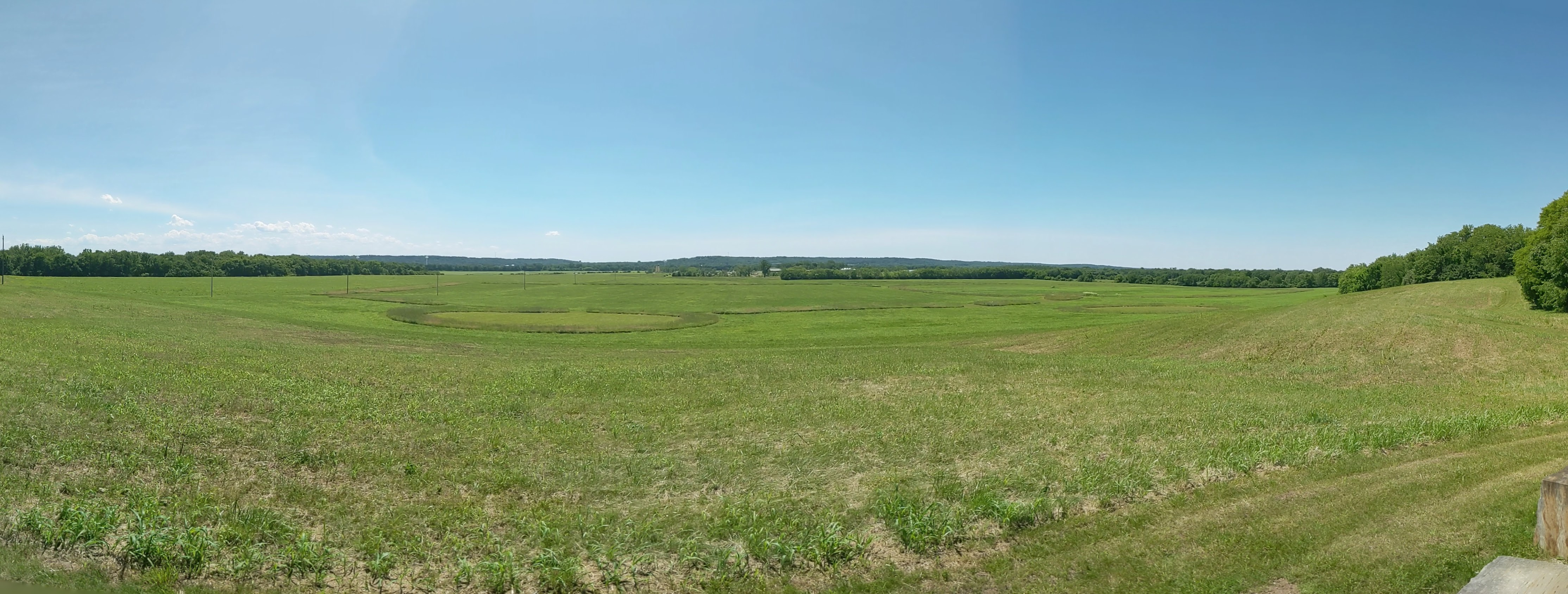
The Hopeton Earthworks from the park's observation point.

== Bibliography ==
- Kois, Dan (2023-09-24). "The Wonders: Sites in Ohio may be as vital to human history as the pyramids". Slate.
