= Hansen site =

Archaeological site in Kentucky, US

Hansen Site
- Approximate location within Kentucky today
- 38°43′25.39″N 83°1′8.72″W
- Cultures: Late Archaic, Middle Woodland, Fort Ancient culture
- Location: South Portsmouth, Kentucky, United States
- Region: Greenup County, Kentucky

The Hansen Site (15GP14) is an archaeological site located near South Portsmouth in Greenup County, Kentucky, United States. The 6-hectare (15-acre) site is on a flood terrace of the Ohio River across from the mouth of the Scioto River, just upstream from the Lower Shawneetown Site and the Old Fort Earthworks. The site was occupied several times over the centuries, with occupations dating from the Late Archaic (2000 BCE), Middle Woodland (300 to 600 CE), and Fort Ancient (after 600 CE) periods.

== Archaic period occupation ==
Investigations by archaeologists have shown that the Hansen Site was lightly occupied probably during the summer months in the Late Archaic period at about 2000 BCE. Distinctive projectile points from this time period have been found at the site, including Cave Run, Merom, and Rowlette style points. Tests of materials found during excavations have returned uncalibrated dates of 2060 and 1930 BCE.

== Woodland period ==
The Hansen Site was occupied twice during Middle and Late Woodland periods. The first was from 300 to 450 CE, with an intensive occupation with activities centering on three circular single post structures and small clusters of households. Evidence has been found for stone tool manufacturing, food storage, and waste disposal. The second episode of habitation was from 500 to 600 CE and centered on more communal structures and many activities such as tool manufacturing seeming to take place in communal areas. During this time period the nearby Old Fort Earthworks and Biggs Site, parts of the Portsmouth Earthworks complex, were constructed by people of the area's Adena culture.

== See also ==
- Bentley Site
- Thompson Site
- Ronald Watson Gravel Site
- Cleek-McCabe Site
- Hardin Village Site
