= Bentley site =

Archaeological site in northeastern Kentucky

- Approximate location within modern-day Kentucky
- 38°43′17.76″N 83°1′22.98″W
- Periods: Madisonville horizon, protohistoric
- Cultures: Fort Ancient culture
- Location: South Portsmouth, Kentucky, Greenup County, Kentucky, USA
- Region: Greenup County, Kentucky

History
- Built: Ca. 1400
- Abandoned: 1625
- Bentley site
- U.S. National Register of Historic Places
- NRHP reference No.: 83002784
- Added to NRHP: April 28, 1983

The Bentley site (15Gp15) is a Late Fort Ancient culture Madisonville horizon (post 1400 CE) archaeological site overlain by an 18th-century Shawnee village; it is located within the Lower Shawneetown Archeological District, near South Portsmouth in Greenup County, Kentucky and Lewis County, Kentucky. It was added to the National Register of Historic Places on April 28, 1983. It is located near four groups of Hopewell tradition mounds, built between 100 BCE and 500 CE, known as the Portsmouth Earthworks.

== Description ==
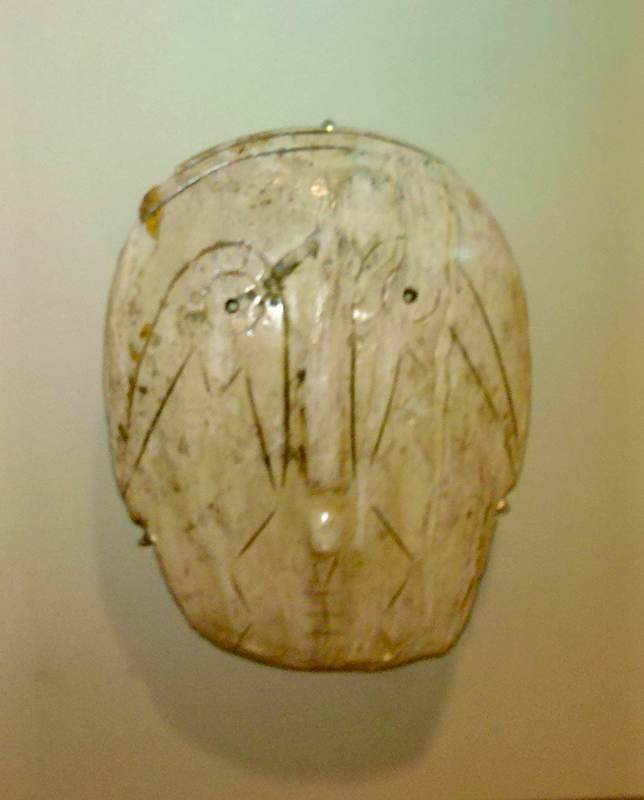
Mississippian shell gorget from the Hardin Village Fort Ancient site, now at the Southern Ohio Museum and Cultural Center in Portsmouth, Ohio.

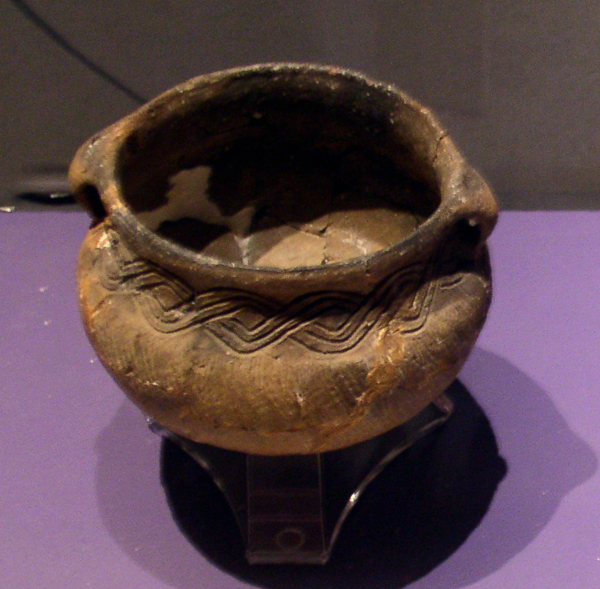
A typical piece of Fort Ancient pottery

The site is a 1.2-hectare (3.0-acre) village on the second flood terrace of the Ohio River, located across from the mouth of the Scioto River. It was excavated in the 1930s and was discovered to have had similar structures and building techniques as those found at another nearby Fort Ancient site, the Hardin Village site located 13 kilometres (8.1 mi) up the Ohio. The site was inhabited continuously from 1400 to about 1625 CE and probably had a population of 250 to 500 people living in long, rectangular houses covered with bark and shared by multiple families, as indicated by the several central hearths and interior partitions.

== Artifacts ==
Prior to the arrival of Europeans, the community engaged in trade with other villages, as evidenced by the presence in graves of ornamental shell gorgets made from the shells of marine mollusks harvested off the coasts of Florida and the Gulf of Mexico. Fort Ancient residents probably obtained these shells by trading salt extracted from boiled brine. Also found during the excavations were distinctive Madisonville horizon pottery, including cordmarked, plain and grooved-paddle jars, as well as a variety of chert points, scrapers and ceremonial pipes.

A variety of locally made tools were recovered from the site, including bone awls, chisels, endscrapers, fishhooks and pins, and some decorative items including pendants, earplugs, and freshwater mussel-shell beads. Tobacco pipes made of stone and ceramic were found, along with a few items of European origin, including copper or brass beads, bracelets, tubes, coils and pendants. These were most likely not obtained directly through contact with Europeans but rather via Native American intermediary trade. Over 300 burials were located, and some skeletons showed signs of tuberculosis, yaws or nonvenereal endemic syphilis.

== Abandonment ==
The village was probably abandoned around 1625, possibly because of periodic flooding of the Ohio River. The Fort Ancient residents of southern Ohio were very likely wiped out in the late seventeenth century by infectious diseases brought by Europeans, particularly measles, smallpox, and influenza. Graves from this period often contain multiple burials—from four to over a hundred individuals—reflecting a sudden increase in mortality typical of epidemics. Depopulation may have been hastened by Iroquois raids during the Beaver Wars (1629–1701).

== See also ==
- Thompson site
- Hardin Village site
- Hansen site
- Cleek–McCabe site
- Ronald Watson Gravel site
