= Biggs site =

Archaeological site in Kentucky, US

Biggs Site
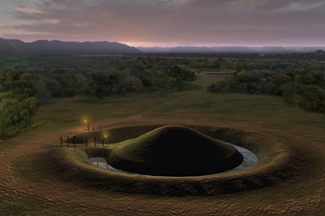
- Artist's conception of the Biggs Site

- Location within Kentucky today
- 38°44′2.7″N 82°56′4″W
- Cultures: Adena culture, Ohio Hopewell culture
- Location: South Shore, Kentucky, Greenup County, Kentucky, USA
- Region: Greenup County, Kentucky

Site notes
- Architectural styles: earthworks, causewayed ring ditch

The Biggs Site (15Gp8), also known as the Portsmouth Earthworks Group D, is an Adena culture archaeological site located near South Shore in Greenup County, Kentucky. Biggs was originally a concentric circular embankment and ditch surrounding a central conical burial mound with a causeway crossing the ring and ditch. It was part of a larger complex, the Portsmouth Earthworks, located across the Ohio River and now mostly obliterated by agriculture and the developing city of Portsmouth, Ohio.

== Description ==
The site was surveyed and mapped by E. G. Squier in 1847 for inclusion in the seminal archaeological and anthrolopological work Ancient Monuments of the Mississippi Valley. They described the earthwork as being a causewayed embankment 5 feet (1.5 m) high by 30 feet (9.1 m) wide encircling a ditch 6 feet (1.8 m) deep and 25 feet (7.6 m) across. They encircled an area 90 feet (27 m) in diameter. In the center of the ditch was a conical tumulus 8 feet (2.4 m) high and 40 feet (12 m) in diameter.

== Gallery ==
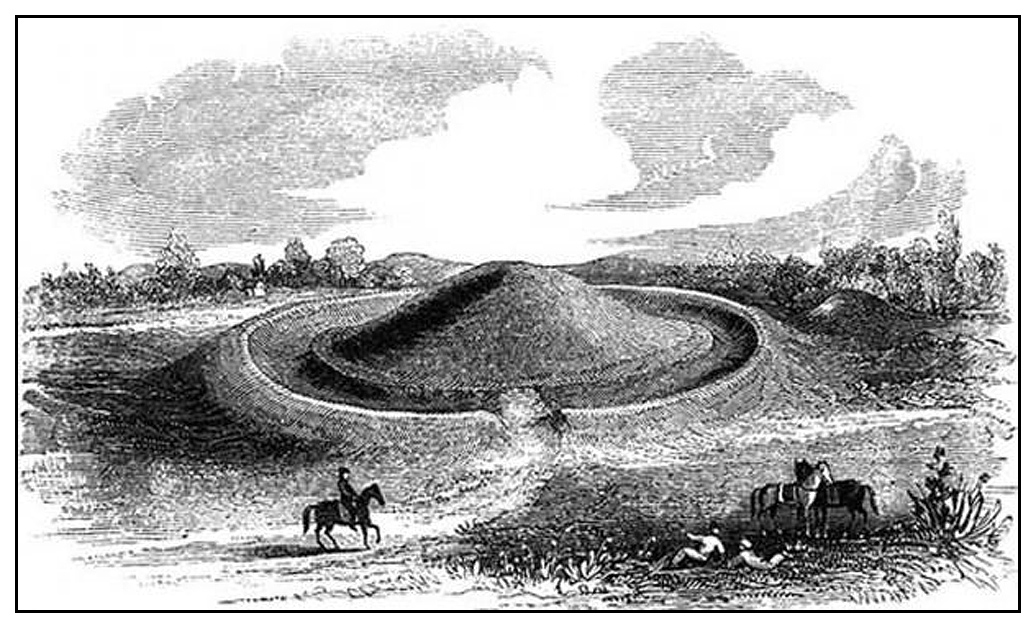
Squier and Davis illustration of the Biggs Site

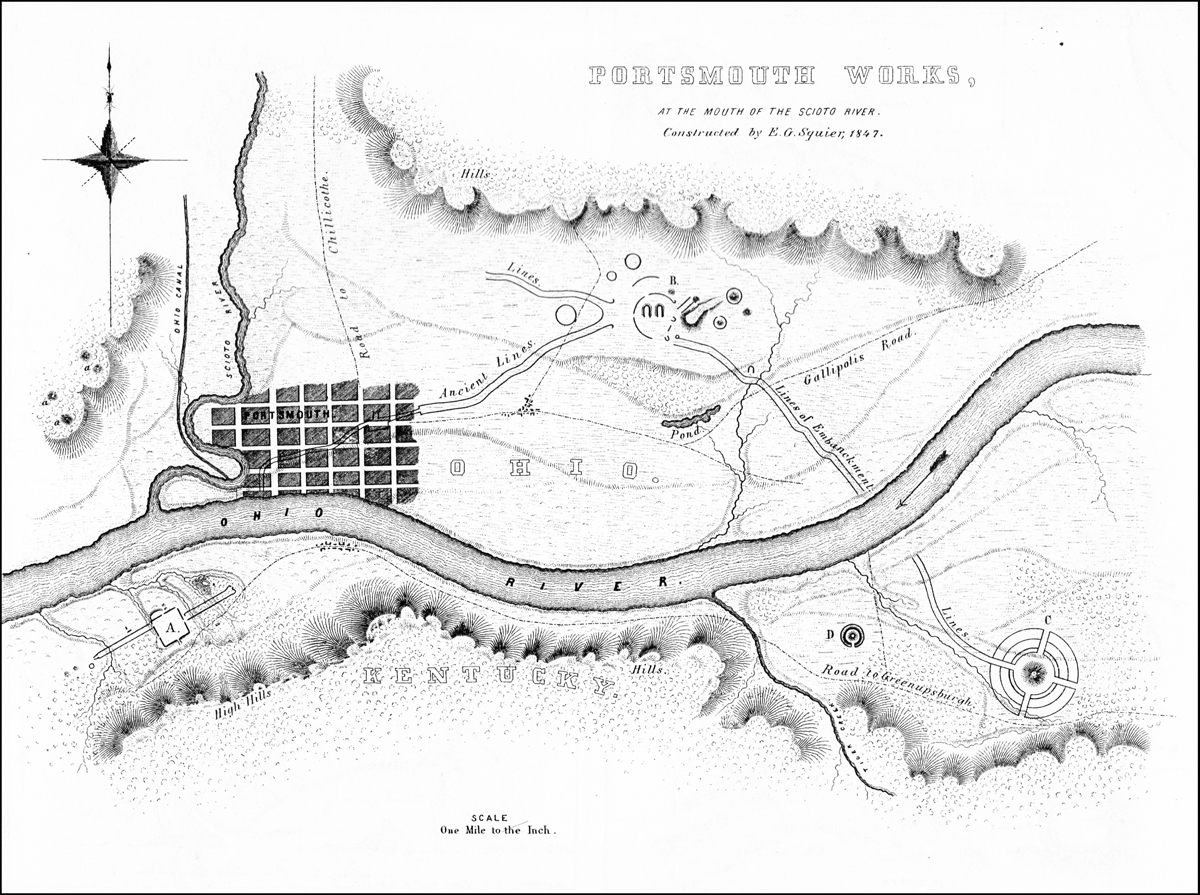
Squier and Davis map with Group D or the Biggs Site

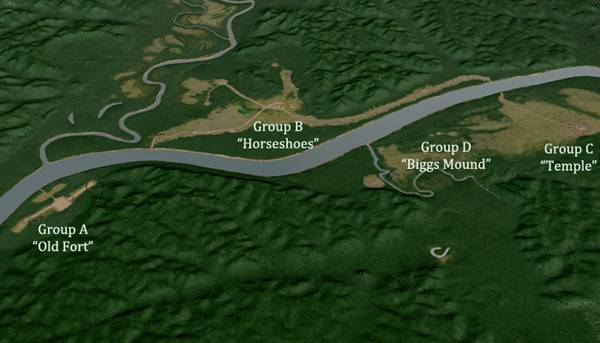
Scale aerial illustration of the Portsmouth Earthworks

== See also ==
- Hardin Village Site
- Lower Shawneetown
- Thompson Site
