= Portsmouth Earthworks =

Archaeological site in Ohio, United States

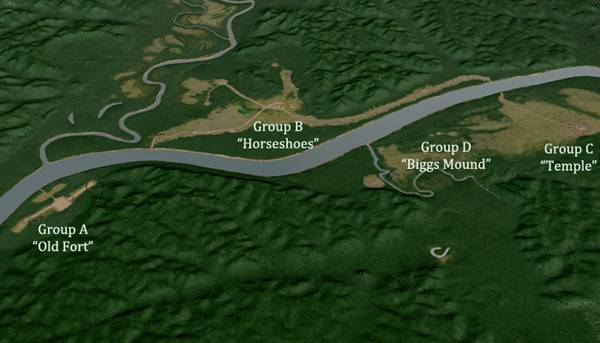
- Aerial illustration of the Portsmouth Earthworks Groups A, B, C, and D
- Interactive map of Portsmouth Earthworks
- Cultures: Adena culture, Hopewell culture
- Location: Portsmouth, Ohio, U.S.
- Region: Southern Ohio and Northeastern Kentucky

History
- Built: 100 BCE
- Abandoned: 500 CE

Site notes
- Architectural styles: Earthworks, enclosure, causeway, causewayed ring ditch
- Horseshoe Mound
- U.S. National Register of Historic Places
- Location: Scioto County, Ohio
- Nearest city: Portsmouth, Ohio
- Coordinates: 38°44′35.70″N 82°58′38.39″W
- Built: 499-0 BCE, 499-0 CE, 1000-500 CE
- NRHP reference No.: 74001621
- Added to NRHP: 1974
- Portsmouth Earthworks, Group A
- U.S. National Register of Historic Places
- Location: Greenup County, Kentucky
- Nearest city: South Portsmouth
- Coordinates: 38°43′17.76″N 83°1′22.98″W
- Built: 499-0 BCE, 499-0 CE, 1000-500 CE, 1499-1000 CE, 1749-1500 CE, 1750-1799 CE
- NRHP reference No.: 80001534
- Added to NRHP: December 4, 1980

The Portsmouth Earthworks are a large prehistoric mound complex constructed by the Native American Adena and Ohio Hopewell cultures of eastern North America (100 BCE to 500 CE). The site was one of the largest earthwork ceremonial centers constructed by the Hopewell and is located at the confluence of the Scioto and Ohio Rivers, in present-day Ohio.

The majority of the mound complex site is now covered by the city of Portsmouth in Scioto County, Ohio. Several individual sections of the complex have been included on the National Register of Historic Places.

== Description ==
Originally, the Portsmouth Earthworks consisted of three sections extending over twenty miles of the Ohio River valley, crossing from Ohio to Kentucky in several places. It was surveyed and mapped by E. G. Squier in 1847 for inclusion in the seminal archaeological and anthrolopological work Ancient Monuments of the Mississippi Valley.

=== Portsmouth Earthworks, Group B ===
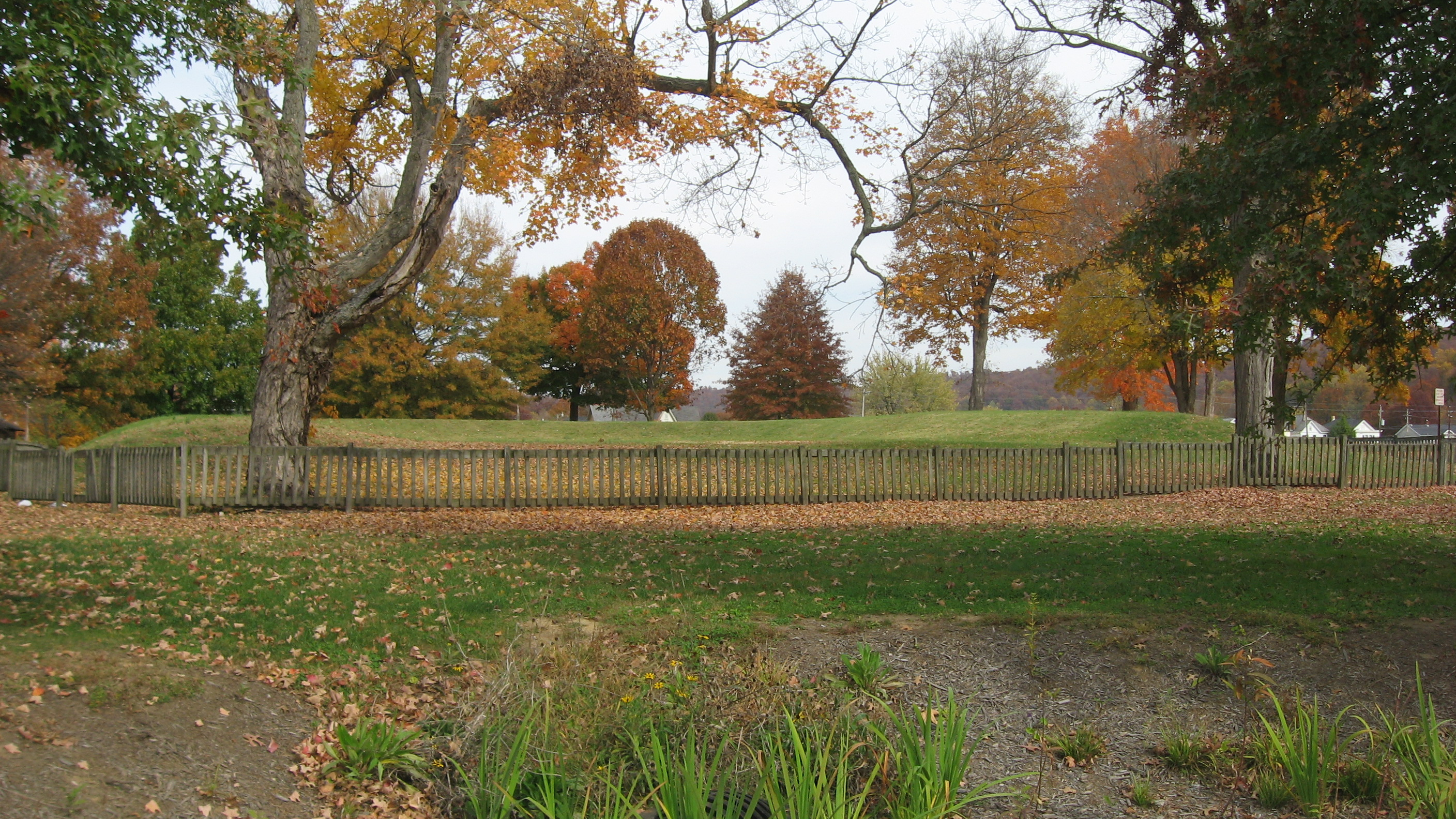
Overview of the Horseshoe Mound

The northernmost section was made up of a number of circular enclosures, two large horseshoe-shaped enclosures, and three sets of parallel-walled roads leading away in different directions. One set of walled roads extends across the Ohio River into South Portsmouth, Kentucky to the southwest to Portsmouth Earthworks, Group A. Another set of walled roads lead to the southeast where it also crossed the Ohio River and lead to Portsmouth Earthworks, Group C. The third set of walled roads lead to the northwest for an undetermined distance, and may point to Tremper Mound and Works, some 5 miles away. The City of Portsmouth maintains a public park which includes one of the remaining horseshoe-shaped enclosures, known as Mound Park, it is the only publicly accessible part of the complex. Under the name Horseshoe Mound it was listed on the National Register of Historic Places in 1974.

In 2019 two independent scholars proposed that the Group B mounds represent part of an eight-mile-long female effigy mound, which the authors propose depicts "The Woman Who Fell from the Sky," a Native American myth about human origins found among the indigenous peoples of North America. If true, this would make it the longest effigy mound known, although much of the structure was destroyed by the city of Portsmouth. The authors link the mounds to the story of He-nau-ee, as told by the Meskwaki Indians, possible descendants of the Hopewell mound builders. Other archeologists have cast doubt on the theory.

=== Portsmouth Earthworks, Group A ===
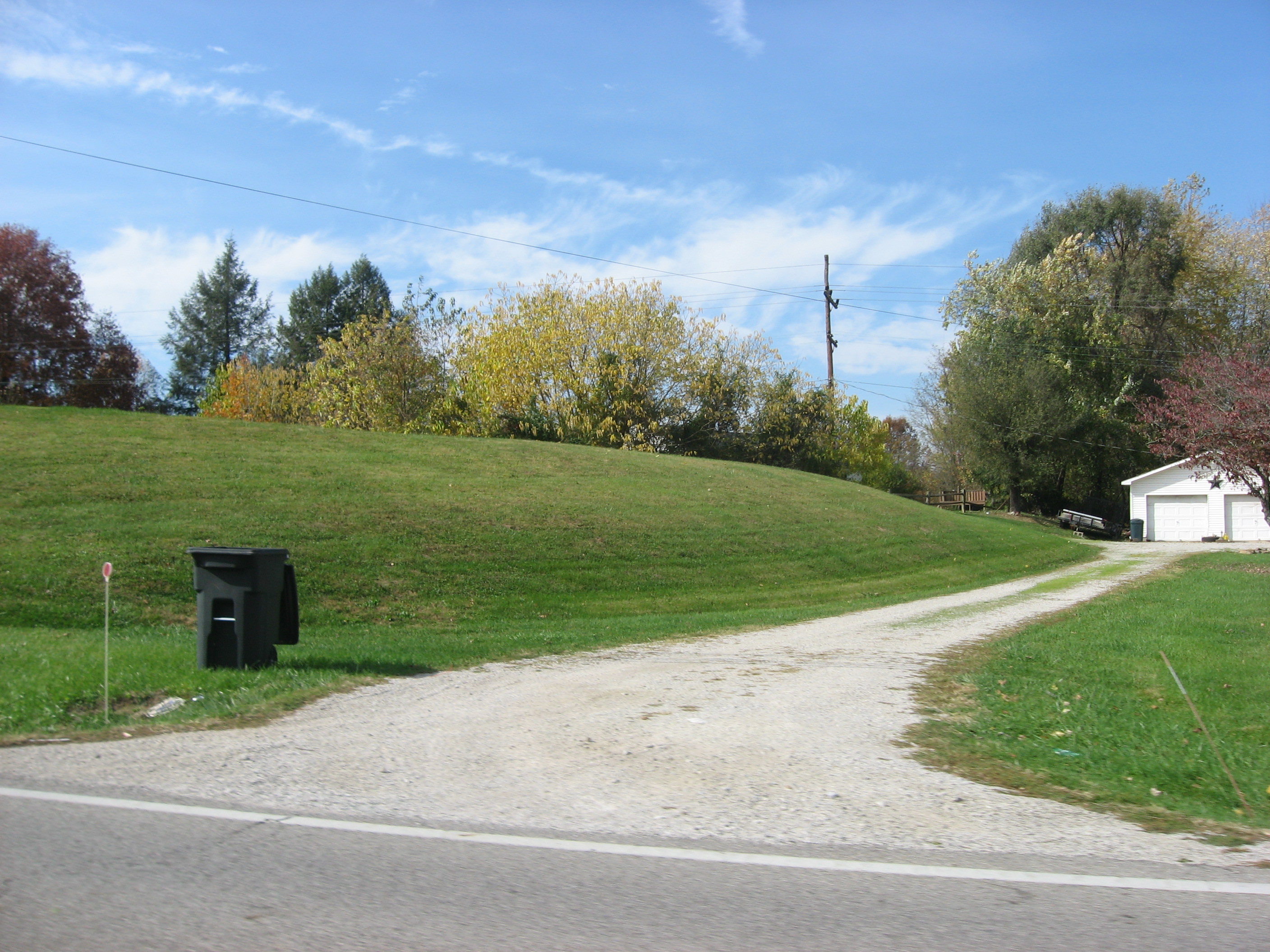
One of the surviving walls

Also known as the Old Fort Earthworks (15Gp1) it is a series of rectangular enclosures near South Portsmouth in Greenup County, Kentucky. Group A is a large square enclosure with two series of parallel walls extending from the northeast and southwest corners. The Old Fort Earthworks consist of several sites, including the Old Fort Earthworks (15Gp1), Mays Mound (15Gp16), Hicks Mound (15Gp265), Stephenson Mound (15Lw139), and several other unnamed mounds and enclosures. It is also the location of Lower Shawneetown, a protohistoric/historic Fort Ancient and Shawnee settlement and colonial trading post which are all part of the Lower Shawneetown Archeological District, along with the Thompson and Hansen sites

=== Portsmouth Earthworks, Group C ===
Group C was a large series of concentric circles surrounding a high central conical mound. This section of the earthworks is located in Greenup County, Kentucky several miles to the east of South Shore, but connected to Group B by a causeway that ran down to the Ohio River.

=== Portsmouth Earthworks, Group D ===
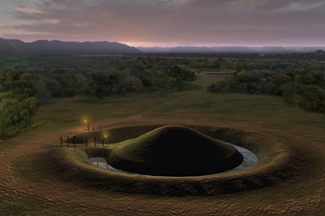
Artists conception of the Biggs site

Located to the west or downriver of Group C is the Biggs site (15Gp8) or Portsmouth Earthworks Group D. Biggs was an Adena culture circular causewayed embankment 5 feet (1.5 m) high by 30 feet (9.1 m) wide encircling a ditch 6 feet (1.8 m) deep and 25 feet (7.6 m) across. They encompassed an area 90 feet (27 m) in diameter. In the center of the ditch was a conical tumulus 8 feet (2.4 m) high and 40 feet (12 m) in diameter. It was not only mapped by Squier and Davis, they also included a small illustration of the feature.

== Gallery of Squier and Davis maps ==
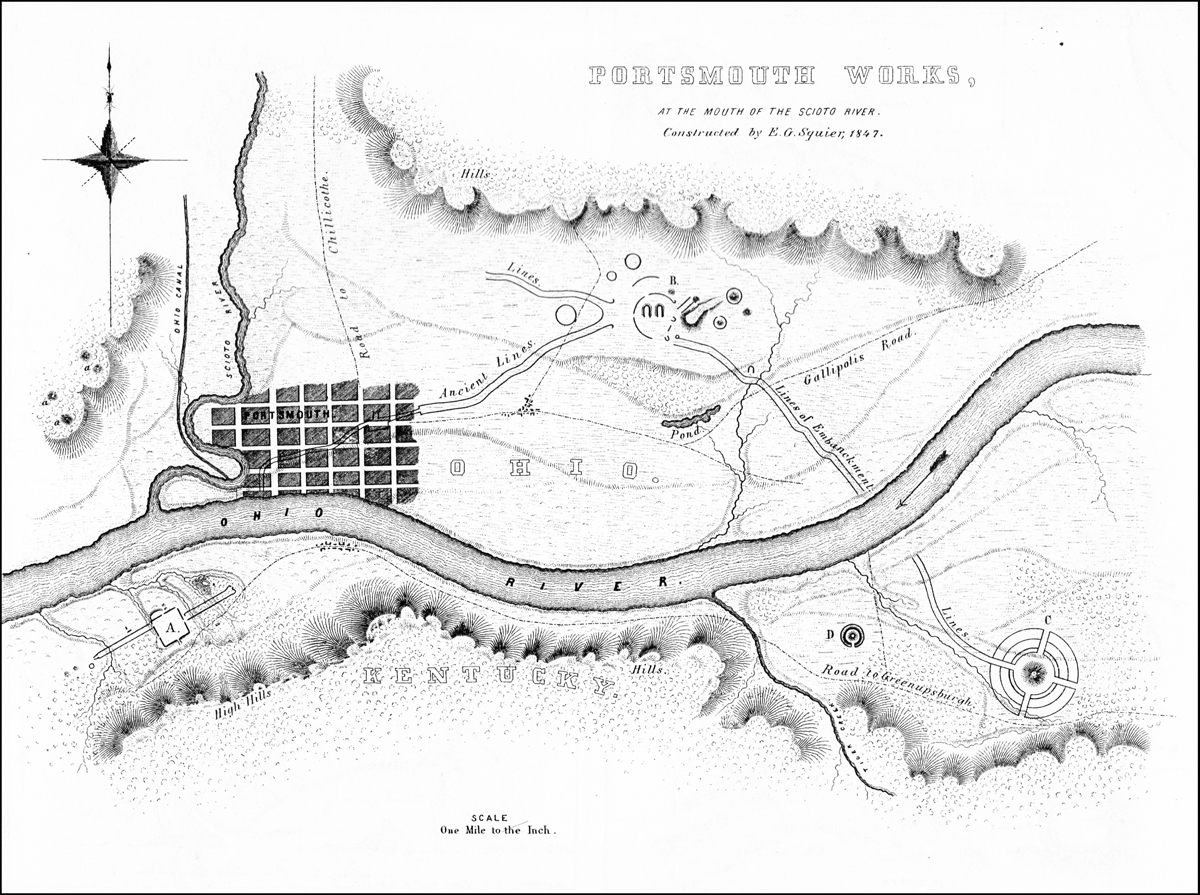

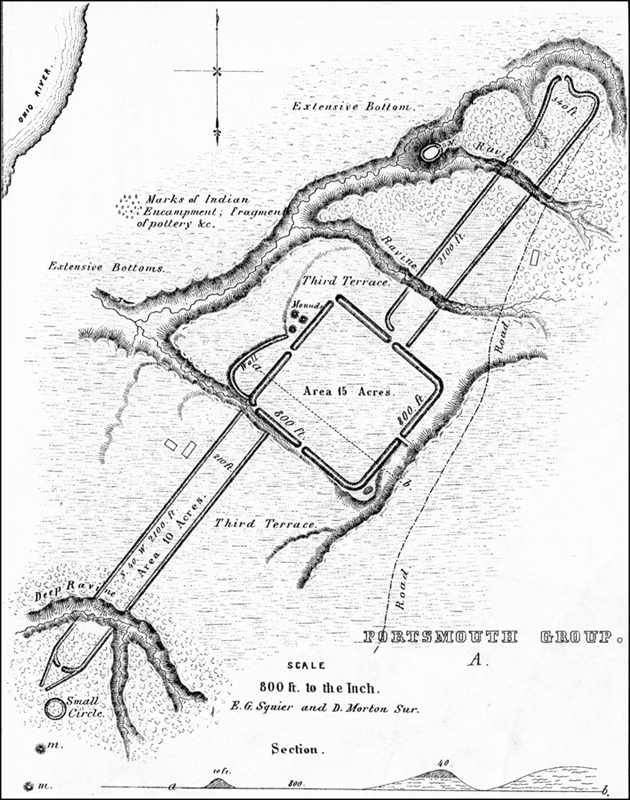

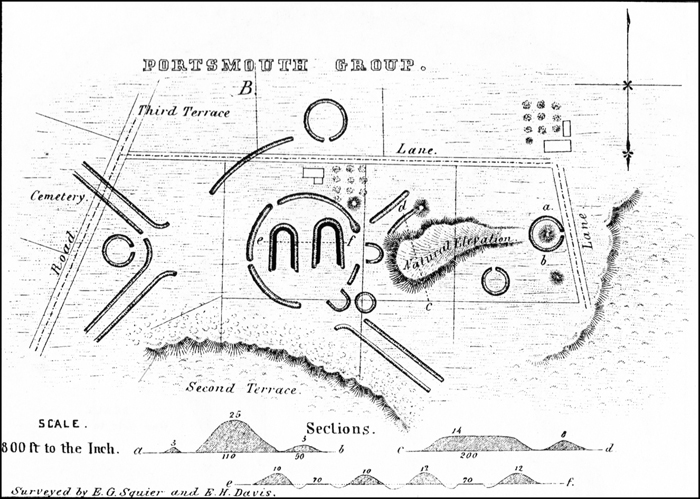

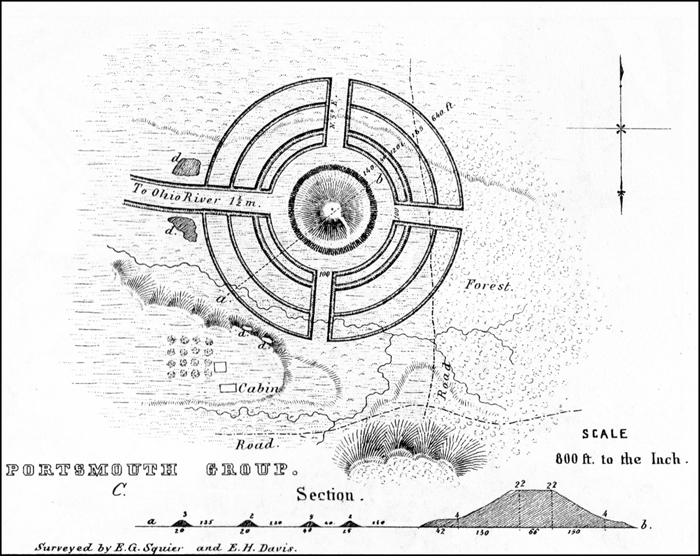

== See also ==
- List of Hopewell sites
