= Ronald Watson Gravel site =

Ronald Watson Gravel Site
- Approximate location within Kentucky today
- 39°3′52.02″N 84°52′53.65″W
- Cultures: Late Archaic, Woodland period, Fort Ancient culture
- Location: Petersburg, Kentucky, Boone County, Kentucky, USA
- Region: Boone County, Kentucky

The Ronald Watson Gravel Site (15BE249) is an archaeological site near Petersburg in Boone County, Kentucky, on an inside bend of a meander of the Ohio River. Excavations have determined that the site was occupied multiple times during the Late Archaic, Middle Woodland, Late Woodland, and Middle Fort Ancient periods, although none of these are transitional occupations from one period to another. It is the best-documented Middle Woodland site in the Northern Bluegrass region of Kentucky.

== Occupations ==
The site is a 0.4-hectare (0.99-acre) open habitation area situated on an alluvial terrace of sand and gravel beds overlooking the Ohio River. The eastern side of the site was occupied twice during the Late Archaic period, 3715 ± 40 years before the present, during the Central Ohio Valley phase (2750-1750 BCE), and 3090 ± 50 years before the present, during the Maple Creek phase (1750–1000 BCE). The site was occupied twice during the Woodland period, during the Middle Woodland (1–500 CE) is dated 83-482 CE and 258-534 CE and the Late Woodland (500–1000 CE) is dated 655–854 CE, 668–893 CE, 692–961 CE, and 785–1017 CE. During this time, residents of the Ronald Watson site relied heavily on nut resources and cultivated native plants from the Eastern Agricultural Complex , such as goosefoot, erect knotweed, sunflower, and maygrass. The Late Woodland occupation, which corresponds to the Newtown phase, marked the most intensive occupation of the site. The site was also occupied briefly during the Middle Fort Ancient period (1200-1400 CE), during the Anderson phase.

== See also ==
- Big Bone Lick State Park
- Cleek-McCabe Site
- Hansen Site
- Bentley Site
- Thompson Site
- Hardin Village Site
