= Cleek–McCabe site =

Archaeological site in Kentucky, US

Cleek-McCabe Site
- Cultures: Fort Ancient culture
- Location: Walton, Kentucky, Boone County, Kentucky, USA
- Region: Boone County, Kentucky

The Cleek-McCabe Site is a Middle Fort Ancient culture (1200 to 1400 CE) archaeological site near Walton in Boone County, Kentucky, in the northern Bluegrass region of the state. It is situated on Mud Lick Creek approximately 11 kilometres (6.8 mi) from the Ohio River. The site has several components, including two mounds and a village.

== Site description ==
The site is a village (Cleek Smithsonian trinomial ID 15Be22) with a centrally located 50 metres (160 ft) to 60 metres (200 ft) wide circular plaza with one burial mound (Cleek Mound 15Be23) at its eastern end and another (McCabe Mound 15Be8) at its western end.

=== McCabe mound 15Be8 ===
The McCabe mound was partially excavated in the 1930s by William S. Webb of the University of Kentucky, and consequently is one of the best documented Fort Ancient burial mounds to date. The mound was about 30 metres (98 ft) in diameter and 1 metre (3.3 ft) in height before this excavation. The fill used to construct the mound was sterile clay, midden deposits, and limestone slabs, and under the mound the WPA excavators found a pre-existing village midden. Because the mound fill and midden under it contained the same pottery debris, archaeologists believe the mound was constructed very quickly. Within the mound archaeologists found the remains of 21 individuals, most in a flexed or semi-flexed position, although a few were in an extended position. Underneath the mound were found the posthole remains of three structures. The earliest was a circular structure 13 metres (43 ft) in diameter. Superimposed over this were two rectangular buildings that were either the remains of one building nested inside the other or two chronologically different structures of different sizes. The larger outer building measured 17 metres (56 ft) by 29 metres (95 ft) and the smaller inner structure 12 metres (39 ft) by 24 metres (79 ft). Within the structures were large circular hearths and a prepared floor area. Because of the size of the structures and the lack of everyday debris found near them it is assumed they were for special community activities or functioned as a charnel house.

=== Cleek mound 15Be23 ===
The Cleek mound measured 24 metres (79 ft) and is 2 metres (6.6 ft) in height. It has never been excavated, so archaeologists are unsure if it contains burials like the other mound or if it is also superimposed over special use structures.

== See also ==
- Ronald Watson Gravel Site
- Hansen Site
- Bentley Site
- Thompson Site
- Hardin Village Site
