= Thompson site =

Archaeological site in Kentucky, US

Thompson Site
- Approximate location within Kentucky today
- 38°43′25.39″N 83°1′8.72″W
- Periods: Croghan Phase
- Cultures: Fort Ancient culture
- Location: South Portsmouth, Kentucky, Greenup County, Kentucky, US
- Region: Greenup County, Kentucky

History
- Built: 1100 CE
- Abandoned: 1200 CE

The Thompson Site is a Fort Ancient culture archaeological site located near South Portsmouth in Greenup County, Kentucky, US, next to the Ohio River across from the mouth of the Scioto River.

The Site was occupied during the Croghan Phase (1100 to 1200) of the local chronology and was a contemporary of Baum Phase sites in the Scioto River valley.

== See also ==
- Hardin Village Site
- Bentley Site
- Hansen Site
- Ronald Watson Gravel Site
- Cleek-McCabe Site
