= U.S. Grant Bridge =

U.S. Grant Bridge (current)
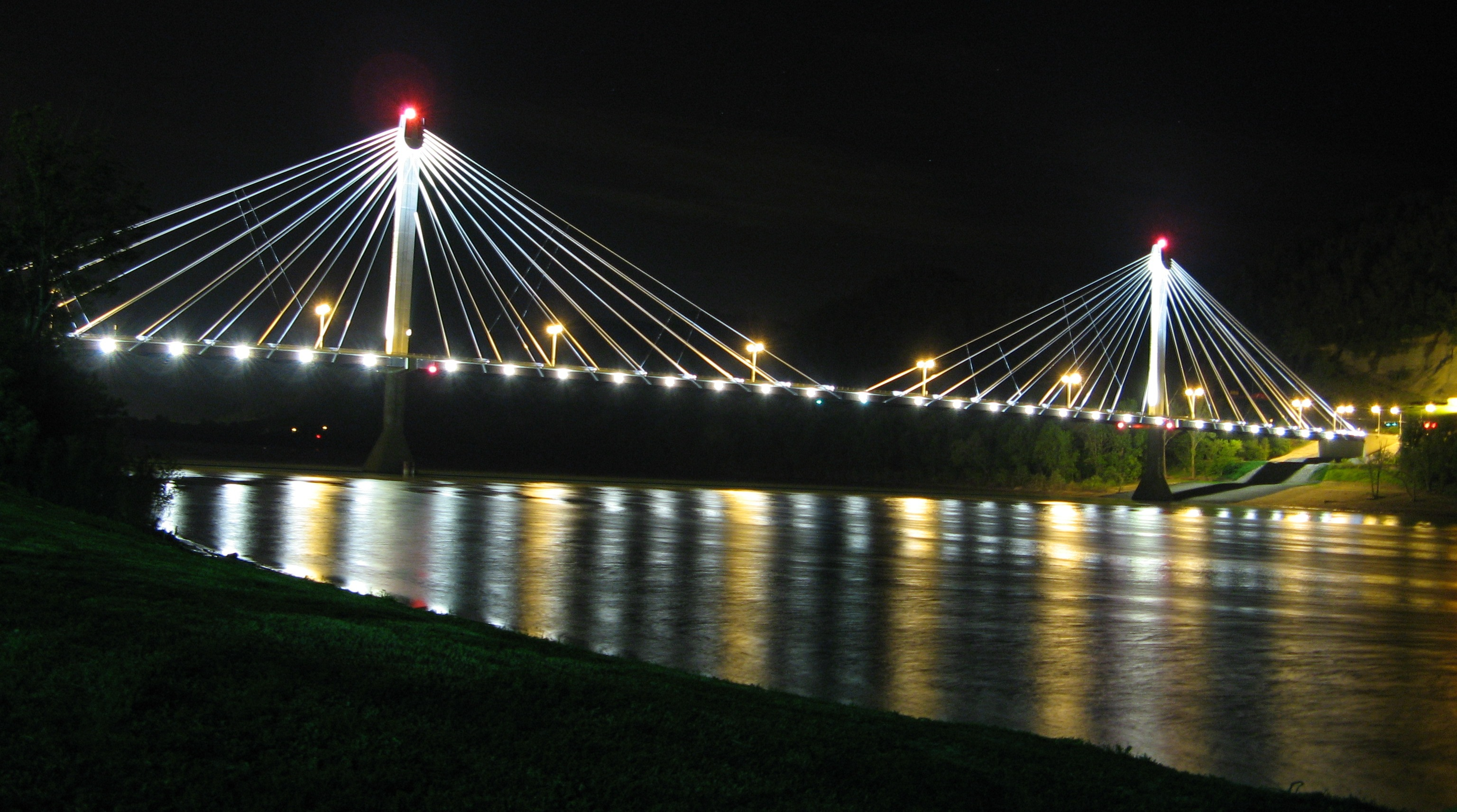
- Current U.S. Grant Bridge carrying US 23 over the Ohio River.
- Coordinates: 38°43′39″N 82°59′50″W
- Carries: 2 lanes of US 23
- Crosses: Ohio River
- Locale: Portsmouth, Ohio and South Portsmouth, Kentucky
- Maintained by: Ohio Department of Transportation

Characteristics
- Design: Cable-stayed bridge
- Total length: 2,155 feet (657 m)
- Longest span: 875 feet (267 m)

History
- Opened: October 16, 2006 at a cost of more than $28,434,495

Location
- Interactive map of U.S. Grant Bridge (current)

The U.S. Grant Bridge is the name of the two bridges that carry and have carried traffic on U.S. Route 23 between Portsmouth, Ohio and South Portsmouth, Kentucky (just west of the city of South Shore) across the Ohio River in the United States. The original suspension bridge was closed and demolished in 2001 and the replacement cable-stayed bridge opened on October 16, 2006.

== Current U.S. Grant Bridge ==
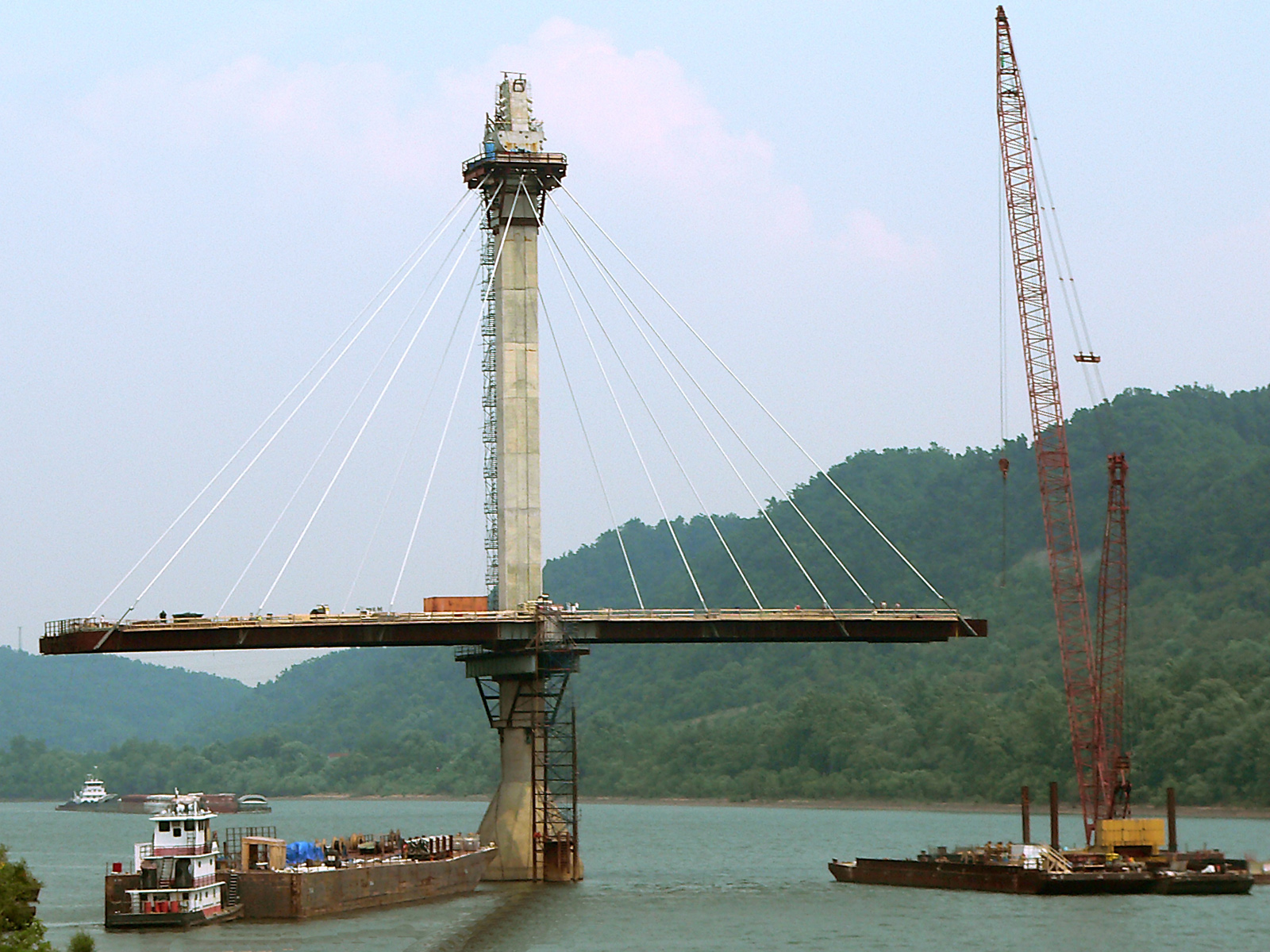
U.S. Grant Bridge under construction on June 21, 2005

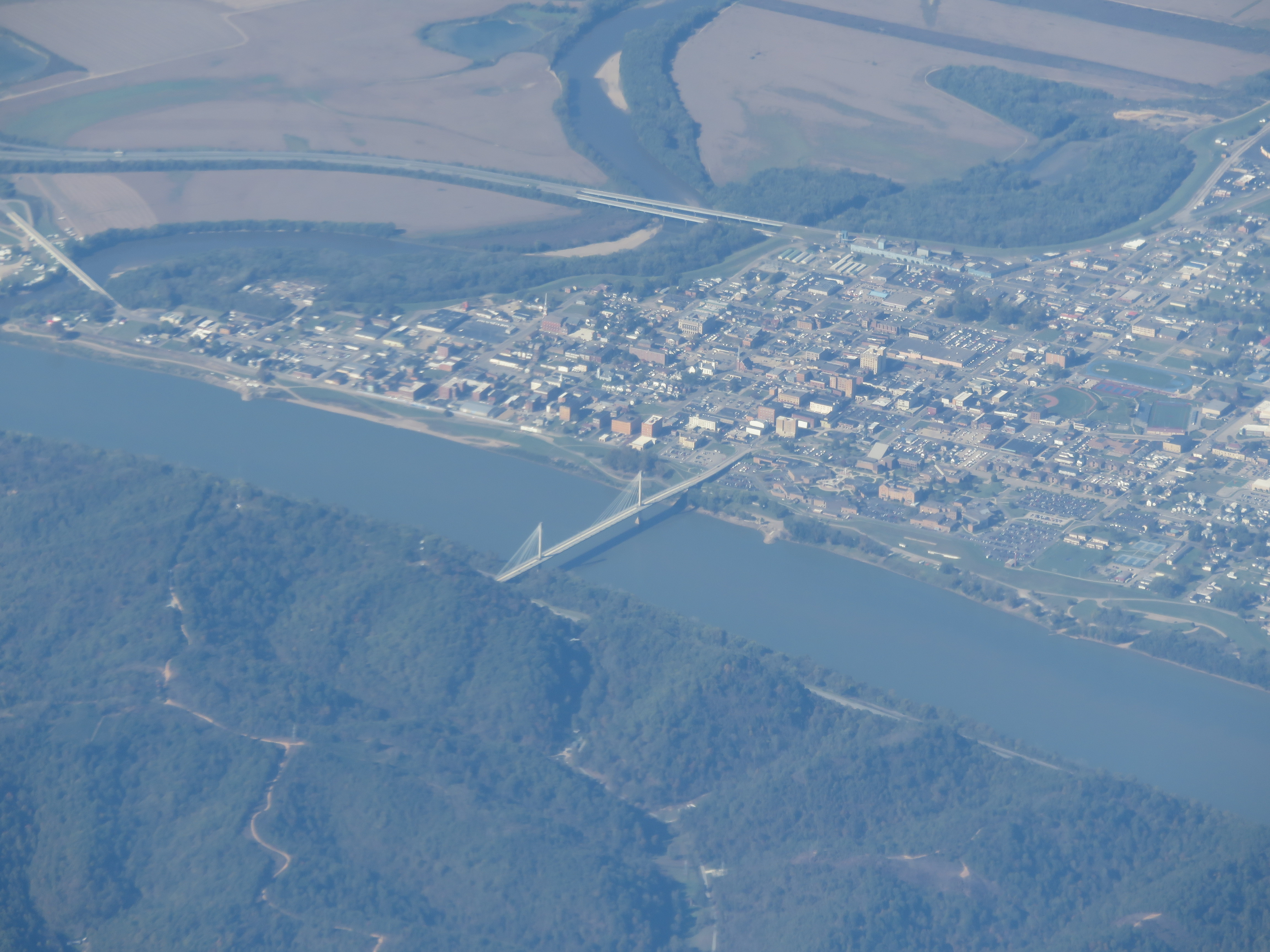
Aerial view of the bridge and surroundings

Contracts for the new U.S. Grant Bridge were given in the spring of 2001. Construction was expected to be complete in June 2004, but work fell behind schedule due to inclement weather, unusual flooding of the Ohio River, and the partial sinking of a floating construction barge which carried one of the cranes used to work on the center span of the bridge. The date of completion was moved to October 16, 2006.

== Original U.S. Grant Bridge ==
U.S. Grant Bridge
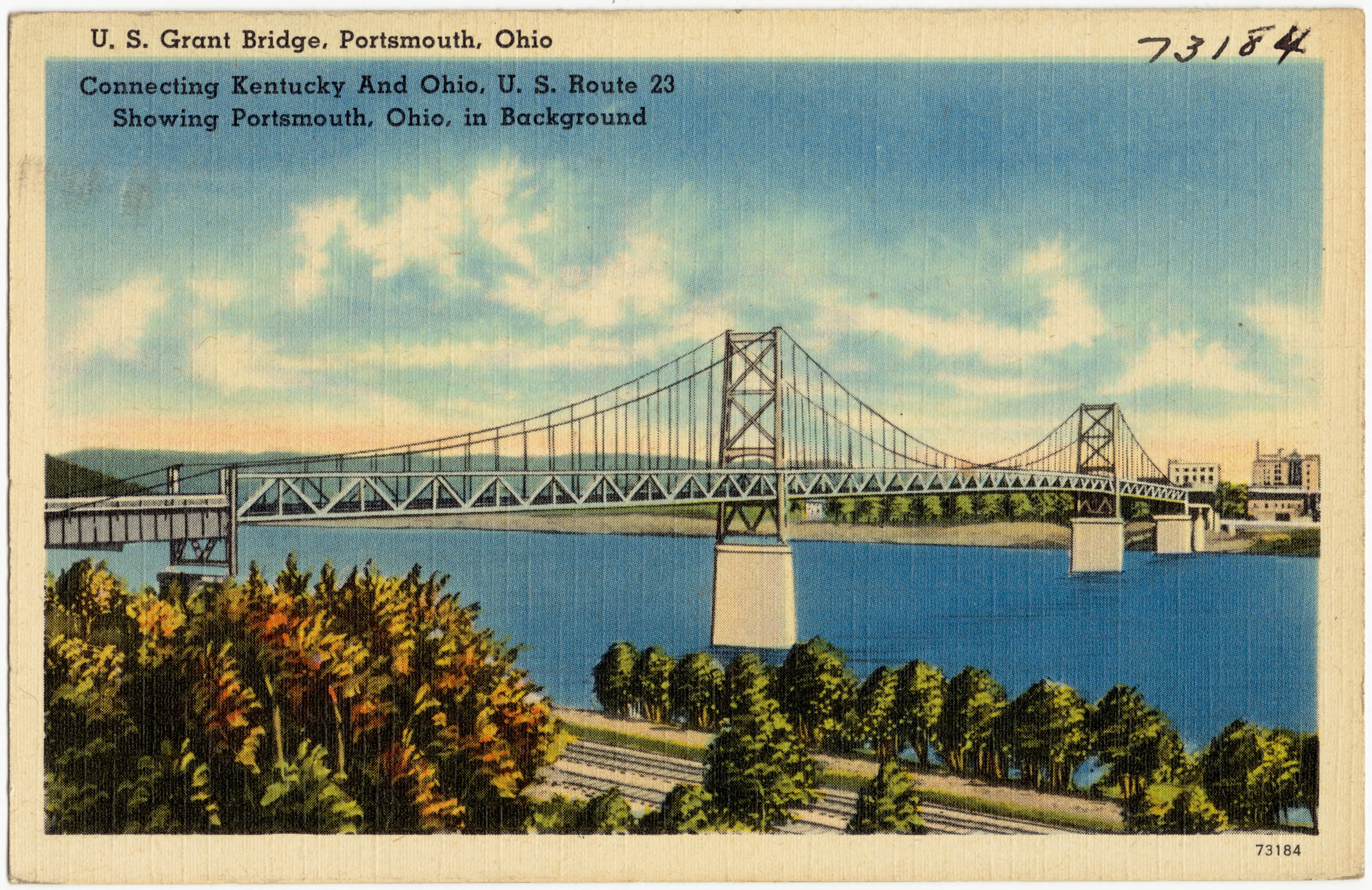
- 1930s postcard
- Coordinates: 38°43′50″N 82°59′49″W
- General U.S. Grant Bridge
- U.S. National Register of Historic Places
- Location within Kentucky Location within the United States
- Location: Ohio R.-Chillicothe and Second St., South Portsmouth, Kentucky
- Coordinates: 38°43′29″N 82°59′53″W
- Built: 1927
- Architect: Robinson and Steinman; et al.
- Architectural style: Cable suspension bridge
- NRHP reference No.: 01000560
- Added to NRHP: May 31, 2001
- Carries: 2 lanes of US 23
- Crosses: Ohio River
- Locale: Portsmouth, Ohio and South Portsmouth, Kentucky
- Maintained by: Ohio Department of Transportation

Characteristics
- Design: Suspension bridge

History
- Opened: 1927
- Closed: 2001

Statistics
- Toll: tolls dropped in 1974

Location
- Interactive map of U.S. Grant Bridge

The original U.S. Grant Bridge was a suspension bridge. The bridge opened to traffic as a toll bridge in 1927. It wasn't until 1974 when the Ohio Department of Transportation bought the bridge from the Ohio Bridge Commission and removed the tolls. After an inspection found serious deterioration of its suspension cables, the U.S. Grant Bridge closed for repairs over an 18-month period from 1978 to 1979. In order to improve capacity and to add redundancy for vehicular traffic to cross the Ohio River at Portsmouth, a new bridge was proposed downstream from the U.S. Grant Bridge. The proposed bridge would be named the Carl Perkins Bridge and would open to traffic in 1988. In addition, the Jesse Stuart Memorial Bridge, an additional bridge over the Greenup Lock and Dam upstream from the U.S. Grant Bridge, would open to traffic in 1984.

In 1992, ODOT initiated a long-range study to determine whether to continue to rehabilitate the existing bridge or construct a new span. ODOT had spent $9 million from 1977 to 1996 by the time the study was completed to rehabilitate portions of the bridge. According to the study, rehabilitating the span would add only 20 useful years to the suspension bridge before rehabilitation would need to occur again and would cost nearly $30 million. It was found not cost-efficient to continuously rehabilitate the suspension bridge when a new structure would be cheaper in the long-run. The bridge continued to age and once again closed from repairs in 1994.

It was listed on the National Register of Historic Places on May 31, 2001, as General U.S. Grant Bridge. It was deemed "significant as it represents the first private toll bridge across the Ohio River between Wheeling, West Virginia and Cincinnati, Ohio, and as such provided a strategic vehicular transportation link between southern Ohio and northeastern Kentucky. The U.S. Grant Bridge was also Ohio's first north-south automobile link crossing the Ohio River between Cincinnati and Ironton and today stands as an important engineering achievement associated with the development of early motoring and interstate commerce." It was also deemed notable for "the role the General U. S. Grant Bridge design occupies in the career of David B. Steinman. Steinman, a principal in the engineering consulting firm of Robinson and Steinman, ranked among the nation's prominent early 20th century suspension bridge design firms. Steinman achieved national renown as a bridge designer and author during his long career from 1914 until his death in 1960. His General U. S. Grant Bridge was the second American suspension bridge built with a continuous stiffening truss and the first American suspension bridge with towers of the rocker type (ENR, pp. 622-623). The sand-filled anchorages were equally innovative."

On July 3, 2001, the original suspension bridge was permanently closed to traffic and the entire structure was torn down within a few months.

== See also ==
- List of crossings of the Ohio River
