= Chillicothe =

Chillicothe may refer to:

- Chalahgawtha, a division of the Shawnee tribe
- Chillicothe, Ohio
  - Chillicothe Turnpike, a highway
  - Chillicothe Paints, a collegiate summer baseball team
- Chillicothe, Illinois
- Chillicothe, Iowa
- Chillicothe, Missouri
- Chillicothe, Texas
- Chillicothe (film), a 1999 film by Todd Edwards

== See also ==
- Marah macrocarpa, commonly called chilicothe with one L
