= Lower Shawneetown =

Historic Native American village on the Ohio River

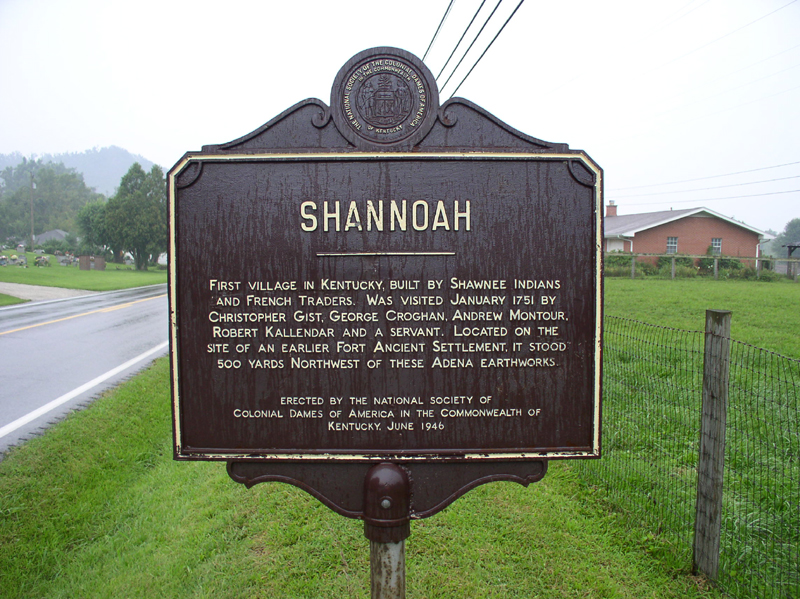
- Bronze historical marker near site

- Approximate location within Kentucky today
- 38°43′17.76″N 83°1′22.98″W
- Cultures: Shawnee people
- Location: South Portsmouth, Kentucky, Greenup County, Kentucky, Portsmouth, Ohio, US
- Region: Greenup County, Kentucky and Scioto County, Ohio

History
- Built: C. 1733
- Abandoned: November, 1758

Site notes
- Archaeologists: A. Gwynn Henderson
- Lower Shawneetown
- U.S. National Register of Historic Places
- NRHP reference No.: 83002784
- Added to NRHP: 28 April 1983

Lower Shawneetown, also known as Shannoah or Sonnontio, was an 18th-century Shawnee village located within the Lower Shawneetown Archeological District, near South Portsmouth in Greenup County, Kentucky and Lewis County, Kentucky. The population eventually occupied areas on both sides of the Ohio River, and along both sides of the Scioto River in what is now Scioto County, Ohio. It was added to the National Register of Historic Places on 28 April 1983. It is near the Bentley site, a Madisonville Horizon settlement inhabited between 1400 and 1625. Nearby, to the east, there are also four groups of Hopewell tradition mounds, built between 100 BCE and 500 CE, known as the Portsmouth Earthworks.

Extensive archaeological work has provided a clear picture of the town's appearance and activities, particularly the nature of trade, social organization, agriculture, and relationships with other Native American communities. Well-known British traders William Trent and George Croghan maintained trading posts in the town with large warehouses to store furs, skins, and other goods.

Between about 1734 and 1758 Lower Shawneetown became a center for commerce and diplomacy, "a sort of republic" populated mainly by Shawnee, Haudenosaunee, and Lenape. By 1755, its population exceeded 1,200, making it one of the largest Native American communities in the Ohio Country, second only to Pickawillany. The size and diversity of the town's population attracted both French and British traders, leading to political competition between France and Britain to influence the community in the years preceding the French and Indian War. The town remained politically neutral in spite of frequent visits by French, British and Native American leaders. Several English captives, including Mary Draper Ingles and Samuel Stalnaker, were held captive in Lower Shawneetown in the 1750s.

Lower Shawneetown was abandoned in 1758 to avoid colonial American raids during the French and Indian War, and was relocated further up the Scioto River to the Pickaway Plains.

== Foundation and names ==
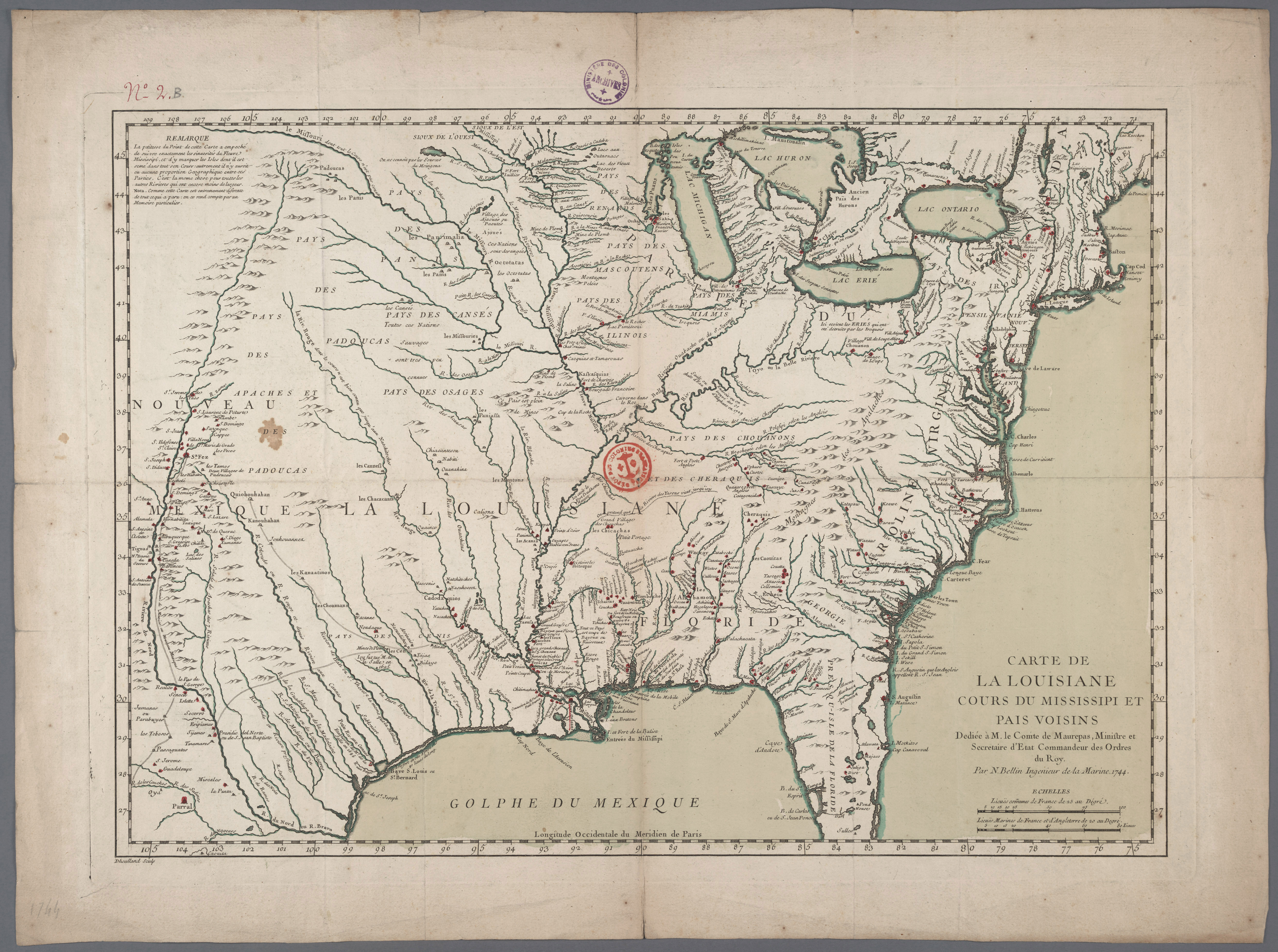
1744 map of eastern North America by Jacques-Nicolas Bellin, showing "Village Chouanon" on the Ohio ("Oyo") River, probably the first representation of Lower Shawneetown on any map.

Established in the mid-1730s at the confluence of the Scioto and Ohio Rivers, Lower Shawneetown was one of the earliest known Shawnee settlements on the Ohio River. The first reference to the town is found in a letter of 27 July 1734, written by François-Marie Bissot, Sieur de Vincennes, describing an English trader's warehouse in "the home of the Shawnees on the Ohio River." Historian Charles A. Hanna proposes that the town was established by Shaweygila Shawnees who had been forced out of their home on the Monongahela River by the Six Nations chiefs. The first reference to the Lower Shawneetown by that name was in a letter by William Trent on 20 October 1748, reporting a murder at Kuskusky, when a Virginia trader there was killed following an altercation over some liquor, "which he was tying up, in order to send to the Lower Shawna Town."

The Shawnee name of the town is unknown, but evidence suggests that it may have been "Chillicothe," a Shawnee word meaning "principal place" and typically applied to villages of the Chalahgawtha division of the Shawnees, who dominated the town. On English maps the town was labeled "the Lower Shawonese Town," "the lower Shawanees town," "Lower Shanna Town," "the Shannoah town," or "Shawnoah." The French called it "Saint Yotoc" (which may be a corruption of Scioto), "Sinhioto," "Sononito," "Sonnioto," "Scioto," "Sonyoto," and "Cenioteaux."

Lower Shawneetown was downstream from the much smaller Upper Shawneetown, established about 1751 at the confluence of the Ohio River and the Kanawha River, near present-day Point Pleasant, West Virginia and known to the Shawnees as Chinoudaista or Chinodahichetha.

== Description ==
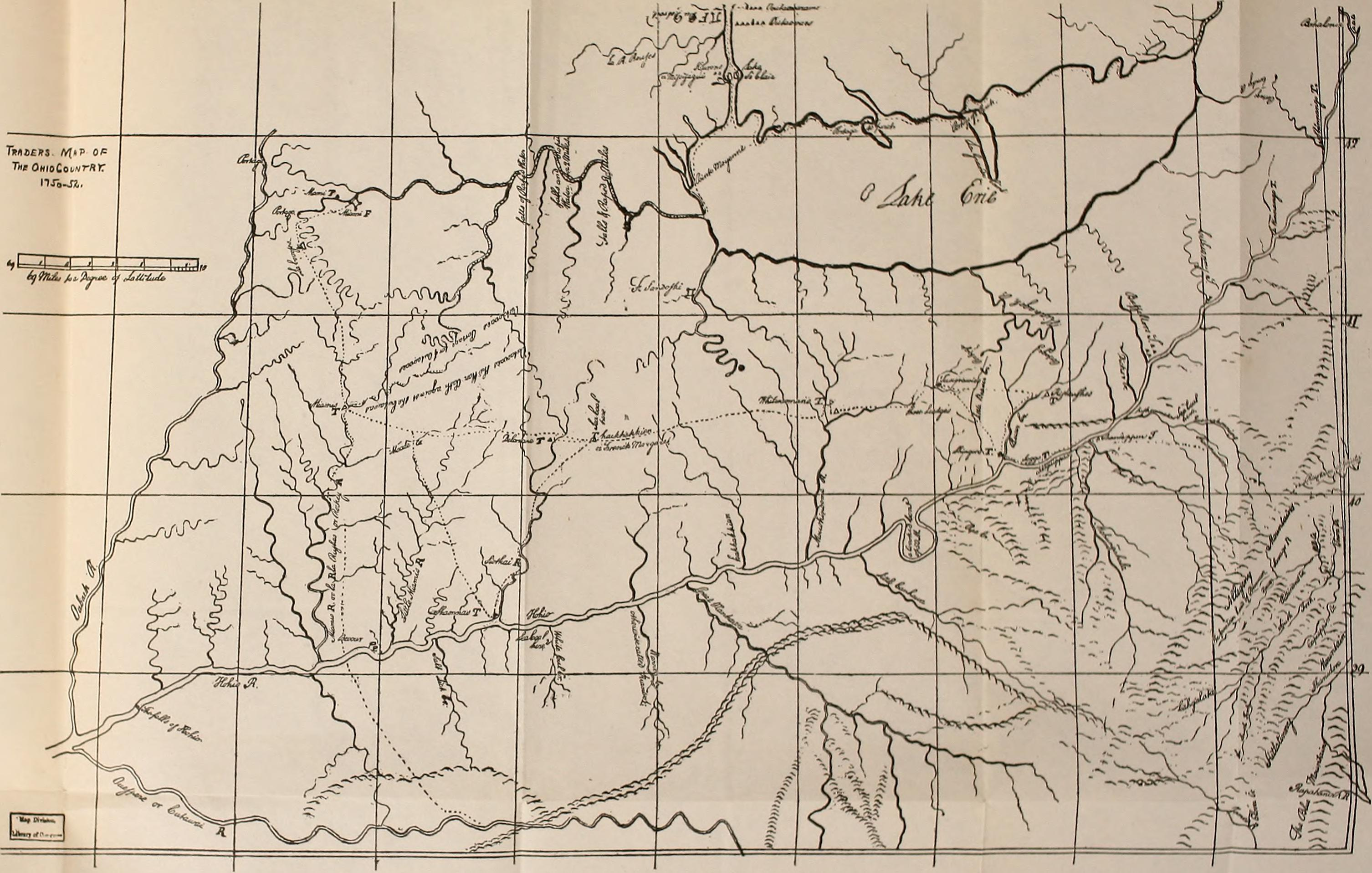
Map by historian Charles A. Hanna showing "Shannoah T." on the "Hohio," lower left of map's center. Taken from a trader's map of the Ohio Country, dated 1750-52

=== Location ===
Pressure from the growing European populations on the east coast of North America and in southern Canada had caused Native American populations to concentrate in the Ohio River Valley, and Lower Shawneetown was situated at a convenient point, accessible to many communities living on tributaries of the Ohio River. The area had Haudenosaunee, Lenape, Wyandot, and Miami communities within a few days' journey. The town also lay near the Seneca Trail, which was used by Cherokees and Catawbas, and the opportunity to trade for furs and to broker political alliances attracted both British and French traders. Within a few years of its establishment, the town became a key center in dealings between Native American tribes and Europeans.

The community was initially built on the south bank of the Ohio River opposite its confluence with the Scioto River, on floodplains and terraces, with later growth of a sub-community on the north bank of the Ohio, along the east and west banks of the Scioto. The Ohio community on the east side of the Scioto, where the village council-house was located, soon became significantly larger than the Kentucky community.

=== Composition ===
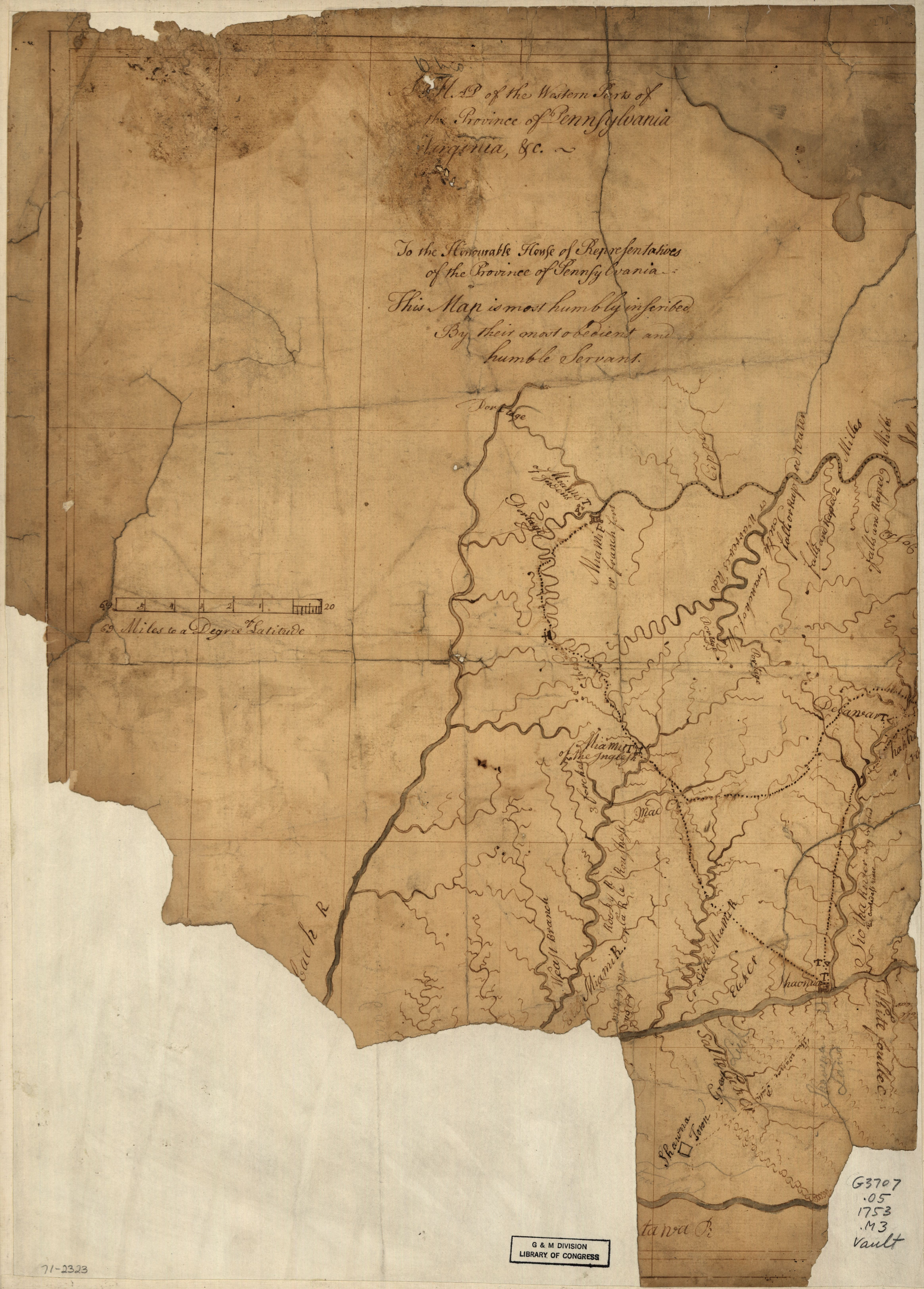
1753 map of Ohio, by John Patten, showing "Shaonua" on the "Siotha River" in the lower right hand corner.

Historian Richard White characterizes Lower Shawneetown and other growing Native American settlements in the region, including Logstown, Pickawillany, Kuskusky, and Kittanning as "Indian republics," multiethnic and autonomous, made up of a variety of smaller disparate social groups: village fragments, extended families, or individuals, often survivors of epidemics and refugees from conflicts with other Native Americans or with Europeans. According to historian Richard Warren, "It was a sprawling series of wickiups and longhouses... French and British-allied traders regarded Lower Shawneetown as one of two capitals of the Shawnee tribe."

Although mainly a Shawnee village, the population included contingents of Seneca and Lenape. After his visit to Lower Shawneetown in 1749, Céloron de Blainville wrote:

this village [is] composed for the most part of Chavenois (Shawnee) and Iroquois of the Five Nations...men from the Sault St. Louis (Kahnawake), there are also some from the Lake of Two Mountains (Mohawks of Kanesatake), some Loups from the Miami (Munsee), and nearly all the nations from the territory of Enhault (Pays d'en Haut, the territory of New France to the west of Montreal)."

=== Size and housing ===
In 1749, Joseph Pierre de Bonnecamps estimated that the entire town had about 60 cabins, but by 1751, the town consisted of 40 houses on the Kentucky side located along bluffs above the floodplain, and 100 houses on the Ohio side atop a forty-foot river bank lined with sycamores and willows. In the town center on the Ohio side there was a 90 feet (27 m) long council house and a large open area or plaza for public events. Houses were clustered together according to kinship, interspersed with gardens, trash heaps and family burial plots. The remains of 23 individuals have been recovered from 16 graves at the Bentley site, among which there were 19 children and adolescents and four adults. Including its 300 warriors, the town may have had a total population of between 1,200 and 1,500. In 1753, after a flood destroyed part of the town which had been on the Scioto River's west bank, some residents relocated to the east bank, and others moved to the Kentucky side of the Ohio River.

According to A. Gwynn Henderson, eighteenth-century homes in this community would have resembled those of the Fort Ancient inhabitants (a Native American culture that occupied the region from about 1000-1750 CE):

...Long rectangular buildings with rounded corners constructed of frameworks of wooden posts set singly into the ground and covered with either thatch, bark, mats or skins. Trade blankets or skins provided "doors" at the ends of the houses. Interior partitions broke up the space within each house, and hearths were located in the center of earthen floors. Pits for storage lined the walls; trash was disposed in outdoor pits or on the ground in heaps behind the house. Bundles of dried food hung from the rafters. However, Europeans described some buildings as huts, cabins or houses--structures with squared logs and covered with bark or clapboard. A few even had chimneys.

=== Surrounding countryside ===
Lower Shawneetown was surrounded by fertile, alluvial flatlands that were ideal for growing corn, beans, squash, gourds, tobacco, and sunflowers. The remains of charred Northern flint corn have been documented archaeologically. The area around the town contained abundant resources: hardwood forests, grasslands, canebrakes, nut-bearing trees, freshwater springs and some with brine. Wildlife included bear, deer, elk, and bison. Tools and pottery could be made from chert-bearing bedrock and clay riverbanks.

In a journal entry from February, 1751, Christopher Gist describes the Ohio country in the area of Lower Shawneetown:

All the Way from the Shannoah Town...is fine, rich, level, Land, well timbered with large Walnut, Ash, Sugar Trees, Cherry Trees, &c; it is well watered with a great Number of little Streams or Rivulets, and full of beautiful natural Meadows, covered with wild Rye, blue Grass, and Clover, and abounds with Turkeys, Deer, Elks, and most Sorts of Game, particularly Buffaloes, thirty or forty of which are frequently seen feeding in one Meadow...a most delightful Country. The Ohio and all the large Branches are said to be full of fine Fish of several Kinds, particularly a Sort of Cat Fish of a prodigious Size.

Residents of the town used Raven Rock, a 500-foot-high sandstone rock formation on the Ohio side, as a lookout point to observe traffic on the Ohio River. Located about 5.5 miles southwest of the town center, the rock allowed lookouts to survey a 14-mile stretch of the river upstream and downstream. It is today part of Raven Rock State Nature Preserve.

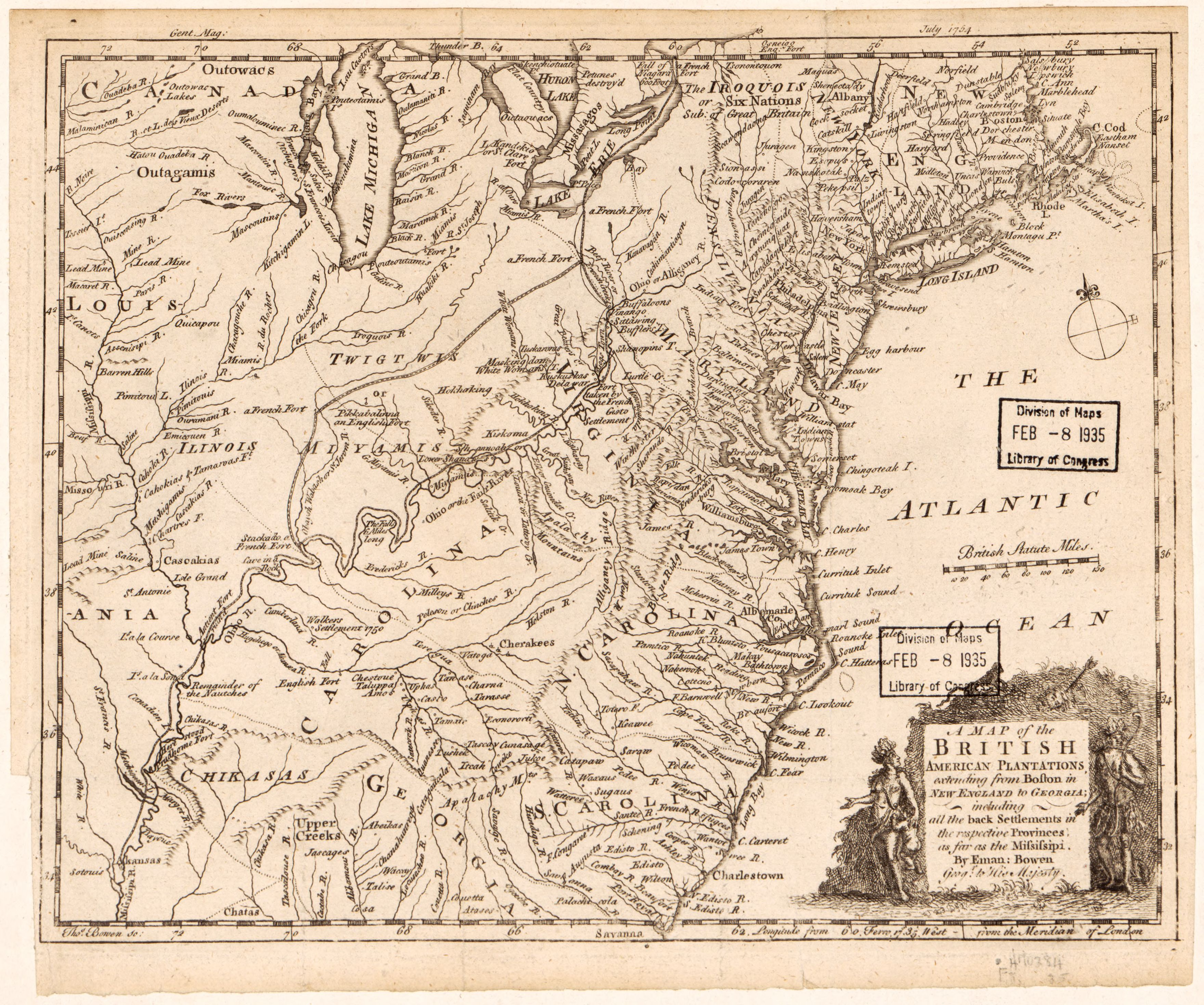
1754 map of British plantations in North America, showing "Shannoah or Lower Shanaws" on the Ohio.

== Visit by the Baron de Longueuil, 1739 ==
The earliest eyewitness account is a report by Charles III Le Moyne, Baron de Longueuil from July, 1739. A French military expedition made up of 123 French soldiers and 319 Native American warriors from Quebec, under the command of Longueuil, was on its way to help defend New Orleans from the Chickasaw, who were attacking the city on behalf of England. While on their journey down the Ohio River towards the Mississippi River, they met with local chiefs in a village on the banks of the Scioto, which was probably Lower Shawneetown, "where the Shawnees gave them a friendly reception and furnished reinforcements." Among Longueuil's officers was the young Pierre Joseph Céloron de Blainville, who returned to Lower Shawneetown in 1749.

== Visit by Peter Chartier, 1745 ==
In April, 1745, Peter Chartier, a métis of Shawnee and French-Canadian parentage, opposed the sale of alcohol in Native American communities and threatened to destroy any shipments of rum that he found, defying Pennsylvania governor Governor Patrick Gordon. Chartier persuaded about 400 Pekowi Shawnee to leave Pennsylvania with him and migrate south, taking refuge in Lower Shawneetown. In May, an anonymous French trader visiting Lower Shawneetown brought a letter from the French government in Quebec, and a French flag, and watched as Chartier attempted unsuccessfully to persuade the leaders of Lower Shawneetown to form an alliance with the French:

They held a council to...hear the reading of Longueuil's letter. After this [Chartier] took the [French] flag and planted it in front of one of the big chiefs of the village, saying to them: "This is what [your French ally] sends you, to continue to [do] the bidding of the general." They all took up arms, saying...they would have nothing to do with it...[that] it was only to make slaves of them...but [Chartier] told them that he would not listen to them.

The same French trader witnessed Chartier's Shawnees performing a two-day "Death Feast," a ceremony conducted before abandoning a village. After staying in Lower Shawneetown for a few weeks, they left the town on 24 June and proceeded down the Ohio River, then in August headed south into Kentucky to found the community of Eskippakithiki.

== French political concerns ==
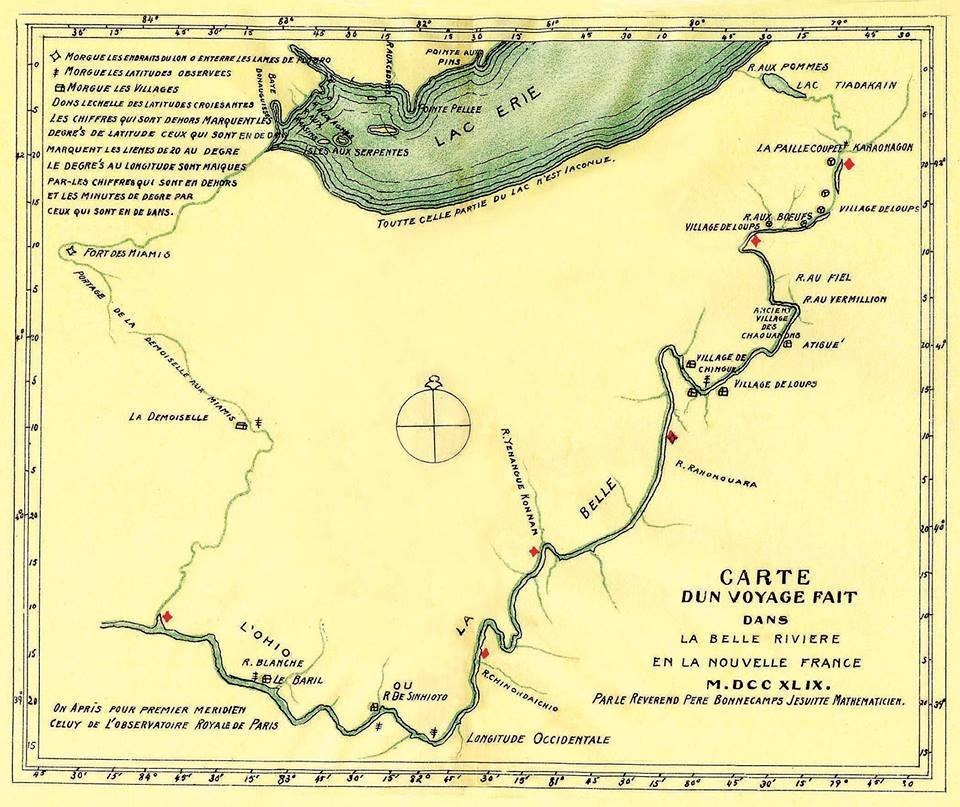
Map of the route followed by Pierre Joseph Céloron de Blainville along the Ohio River in 1749, drawn by Joseph Pierre de Bonnecamps. "Sinhioto" (Lower Shawneetown) appears at the lower edge.

The French had focused much attention on Canada, allowing English traders to establish themselves in the Ohio Valley, but in the late 1740s they took notice of Lower Shawneetown's size and commercial dependence on British trade. In February, 1748, Jean-Frédéric Phélypeaux, French Secretary of State of the Navy (which included the Bureau of the Colonies), wrote that

...it is reported that since the War, [the Shawnees] have been joined by a considerable number of savages of all nations, forming a sort of republic [at Lower Shawnee Town], dominated by some Iroquois of the Five Nations who form part of it; and that, as the English almost entirely supply their needs, it is to be feared that they may succeed in seducing them...I am writing to Monsieur de Vaudreuil regarding that union, so that he may strive to break it.

In May, 1749, Antoine Louis Rouillé, the French Foreign minister, described the town as:

...Established at Sonontio, where it forms a sort of republic with a fairly large number of bad characters of various nations who have retired thither...In fact, there is reason to fear that the bad example of the savages...will lead them to do something evil.

He urged the Marquis de la Jonquière, the Governor-General of New France, to send envoys to persuade the Shawnee population of the town to relocate "either to Canada or Louisiana" for fear the British would recruit Shawnee warriors "to stir up the nations and cause them to undertake expeditions against the French." He added: "If you succeed in inducing the [Shawnees] to leave, it [Lower Shawneetown] will be weakened to such an extent that it need no longer be feared." He also suggested that British traders be expelled from Shawnee communities to discourage trade with the British.

== Visit by Céloron de Blainville, 1749 ==
In the summer of 1749 Pierre Joseph Céloron de Blainville, leading a force of eight officers, six cadets, an armorer, 20 soldiers, 180 Canadians, 30 Iroquois, and 25 Abenakis, moved down the Ohio River on a flotilla of 23 large boats and birch-bark canoes, on his "lead plate expedition," burying lead plates at six locations where major tributaries entered the Ohio. The plates were inscribed to claim the area for France. Céloron also sought out British traders and warned them to leave this territory which belonged to France. Céloron approached the town of "St. Yotoc" on 21 August, where a Lenape Indian they met informed them that the town consisted of "about 80 cabins there, and perhaps 100."

Father Bonnecamps, the geographer of Céloron's expedition, wrote:

The situation of the village of the Chaouanons is quite pleasant, at least, it is not masked by the mountains, like the other villages through which we had passed. The Sinhioto River, which bounds it on the west, has given it its name. It is composed of about sixty cabins. The Englishmen there numbered five.

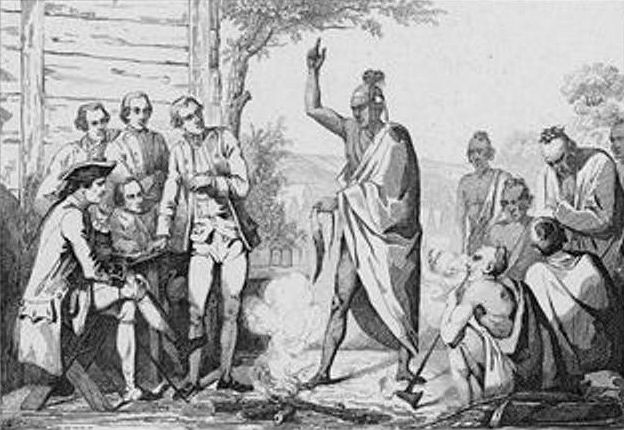
Conference between French and Native American leaders around 1750 by Émile Louis Vernier.

On that morning, several of Céloron's Native American guides warned him that the town's inhabitants might be preparing to ambush Céloron's force, in the mistaken belief that the French were coming to attack the town. Céloron decided to send a delegation ahead, made up of Kahnawake and Abenaki Indians led by Philippe-Thomas Chabert de Joncaire (who was raised in a Seneca community), to announce that the French were not intending to attack them. Hearing that a French military force was approaching, the inhabitants had hastily erected a stockade. Joncaire described it as a "stone fort, strongly built and in good condition for their defense."

As Joncaire's delegation approached the town by canoe, warriors manning the stockade fired three shots at them, all of which struck the French flag they were carrying. Joncaire boldly continued, and when the delegation landed, the Shawnees conducted them to the council house in the center of the town. There, as Joncaire was explaining the purpose of Céloron's expedition, an Indian interrupted him, "saying that the French deceived them and that they came only to destroy them and their families." A number of warriors then "rushed to arms, saying that these Frenchmen should be killed" and Céloron and the others waiting upriver in the canoes should be ambushed. Fortunately, "an Iroquois chief averted the storm." With his help, Joncaire was released to return under guard to the canoes waiting upstream with Céloron and the rest of the expedition. The others who had accompanied Joncaire were held hostage by the Shawnees.

Céloron selected a guard of fifty reliable soldiers and went to the riverbank opposite the town. As he approached, the Shawnees saluted him by firing their guns into the air. The town's chiefs and elders crossed the river and came with flags and pipes of peace. They had cut the grass to prepare a meeting place and everyone sat together. The men taken hostage with Joncaire were brought forward and handed over. The Shawnees invited Céloron to enter the town and address them in their council house, but Céloron was wary of being ambushed:

I was aware of the weakness of my detachment; two-thirds were recruits who had never made an attack...[The Indians] being much displeased, it would have been a great imprudence to go to their village.

He instead invited them to visit his encampment to hear an announcement. The next day, a canoe bearing a white flag approached Céloron's camp, and Shawnee and Iroquois leaders from Lower Shawneetown met with Céloron. They apologized for their "great mistake" [referring to the shots fired at the French delegation].

Céloron negotiated with the leaders of the town for two days but he was unable to persuade them to abandon their loyalty to the English, as "the cheap merchandise which the English furnished was [a] very seducing motive for them to remain attached to the latter." At one point he referred to the visit he had made to Lower Shawneetown as an officer with the Baron de Longueuil in 1739: "What have you done, Shawnese, with the sense you had ten years ago when M. de Longueuil passed here?...You showed to him the kindness of your hearts and your sentiments. He even raised a troop of your young men to follow him." The Shawnee leaders refused to acknowledge any French loyalty, however. According to William Trent, Céloron was informed that the French "must not lay on the East of the [Ohio] River because they intended this side for their Brethren, the English, & they must [not] lay on the West side because they kept that country for themselves, but told them they must lay on the sand where the waters cover when it's high and if they wanted wood, to have...the drift wood...& not cut the smallest stick of green wood, [and] if they did, they would kill them, every one."

On 25 August Céloron summoned the five Pennsylvania traders who were then living in the town and ordered them to leave, stating that "they had no right to trade or aught else on the [Ohio] River." Céloron considered confiscating their goods, but as he was confronted by a large and well-armed Shawnee force, he decided to leave. He wrote in his journal:

My instructions enjoin me to summon the English traders in Sinhioto and instruct them to withdraw on pain of what might ensue, and even to pillage the English should their response be antagonistic, but I am not strong enough and as these traders are well-established in a village and well-supported by the Indians, the attempt would have failed and put the French to shame. I have therefore withdrawn.

In his description of the meeting between Céloron and the English traders, Bonnecamps says, "The Englishmen...were ordered to withdraw, and promised to do so," although he adds elsewhere, "firmly resolved, doubtless, to do nothing of the kind, as soon as our backs were turned."

Céloron's expedition was intended to impress the inhabitants of the Ohio River Valley with the capability of the French to maintain control over the region, but it met with defiance and resulted in a weakening of the French position.

== Visit by Christopher Gist, 1751 ==
In 1750, the Ohio Company hired Christopher Gist, a skilled woodsman and surveyor, to explore the Ohio Valley in order to identify lands for potential settlement, and to undo any French influence lingering after Céloron's expedition. He surveyed the Kanawhan Region and the Ohio Valley tributaries in 1750–1751 and 1753, following the trail of Céloron through the Ohio country, visiting the same Indian towns the French expedition had visited and meeting with chiefs. In 1751 Gist, Indian trader George Croghan and Andrew Montour (interpreter), accompanied by Robert Callender, visited Lower Shawneetown. Gist's journal entry from January, 1751, states:

1755 map by John Mitchell showing "Shawnoah, or Lowr Shawnoes, an English Facty (factory or trading post) lower left of map's center.

Tuesday [January] 29 - Set out...to the Mouth of Sciodoe Creek opposite to the Shannoah Town, here we fired our Guns to alarm the Traders, who soon answered, and came and ferryed Us over to the Town — The Land about the Mouth of Sciodoe Creek is rich but broken fine Bottoms upon the River & Creek. The Shannoah Town is situate upon both Sides the River Ohio, just below the Mouth of Sciodoe Creek, and contains about 300 Men, there are about 40 Houses on the S Side of the River and about 100 on the N Side, with a Kind of State-House of about 90 Feet long, with a light Cover of Bark in which they hold their Councils.

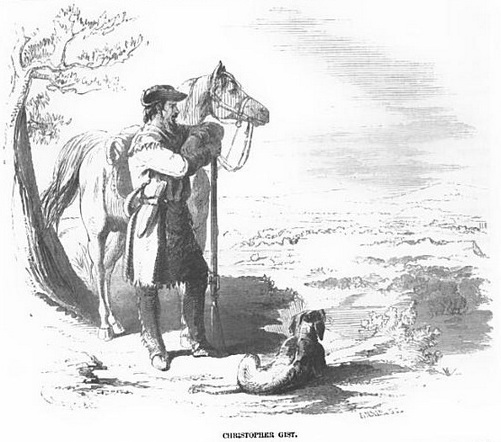
Christopher Gist, surveyor who visited Lower Shawneetown in 1751. Engraving from ‘’Emerson's Magazine and Putnam's Monthly,’’ 1857.

The day after they arrived, Gist, Croghan, Callender and Montour met in the council house with the town's elders and a chief whom Gist identifies as Big Hannaona (probably Big Hominy, also known as Meshemethequater). Croghan made a speech in which he informed the chiefs that "the French offered a large sum of Money to any person who would bring them the said Croghan and Andrew Montour the Interpreter alive, or if dead their scalps." This was apparently a further attempt by the French to drive out the English traders, and Croghan evidently felt safe enough in the community to reveal that there was a bounty on his head. He then promised "a large Present of Goods...which was under the Care of the Governor of Virginia (at that time, Robert Dinwiddie), who had sent Me out to invite them to come and see Him, & partake of their Father's Present next Summer." Big Hannaona responded with a warm speech which concluded: "We hope that the Friendship now subsisting between us & our Brothers will last as long as the Sun Shines or the Moon gives light." The journal terminates with a detailed description of a wedding festival Gist witnessed during his 12-day stay in Lower Shawneetown.

== Commerce with English traders ==
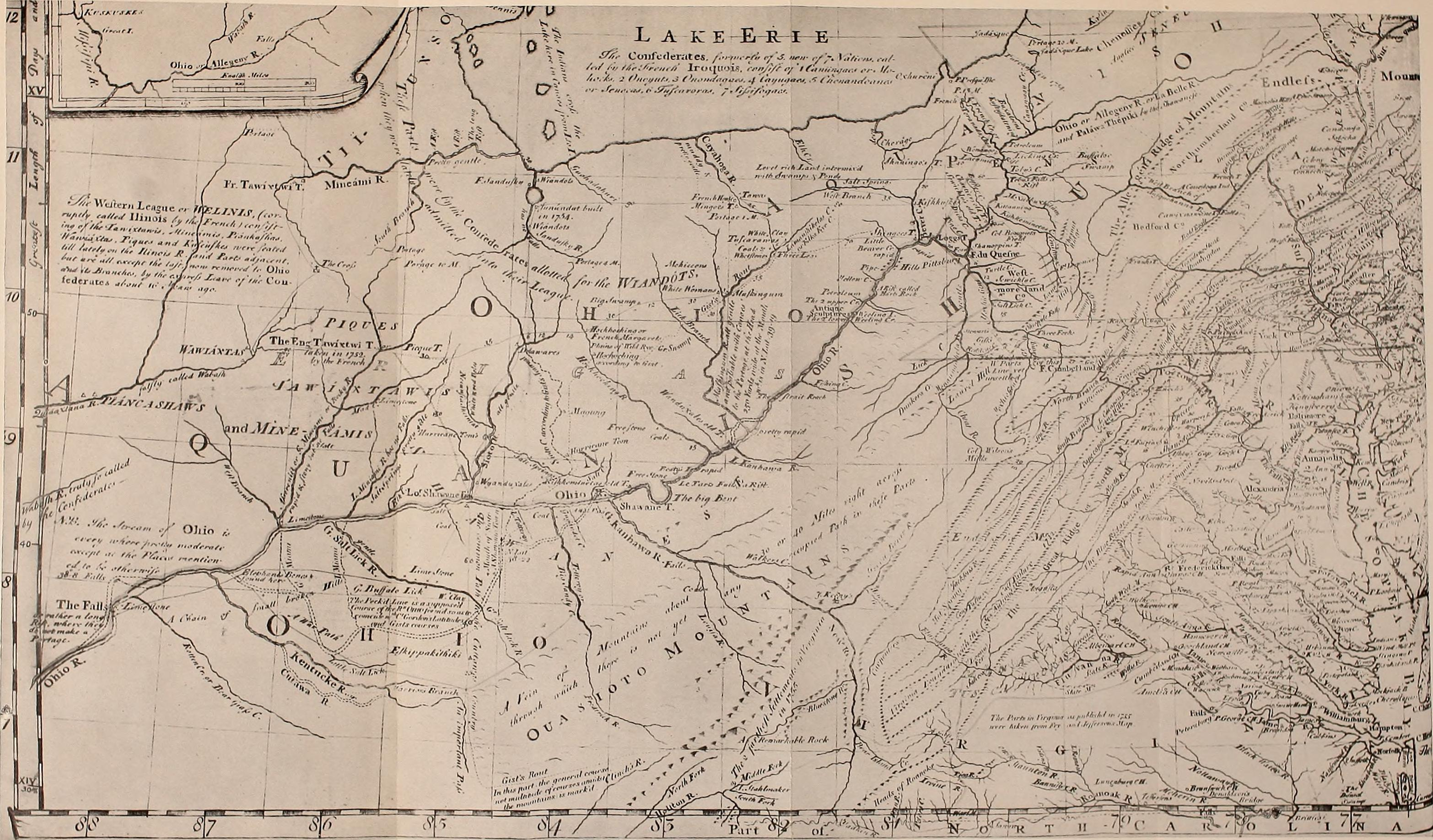
1755 map showing "Lor. Shawnee T." at the junction of the Scioto and Ohio rivers, lower left of map's center.

Indian trader William Trent established a storehouse in Lower Shawneetown in the mid-1730s, and the Shawnees kept it secure in order to encourage further trade with the British. Between 1748 and 1751 the British traders Andrew Montour and George Croghan visited the town three times. In 1749 Croghan built a trading post in Lower Shawneetown (probably outside the town near the main overland trail or the Ohio River bank where traders could beach their canoes), operating in conjunction with his trading posts already established at Pine Creek, Oswegle Bottom, Muskingum, and Pickawillany, dominating the Ohio Valley deerskin trade. He may have spent the winter of 1752–1753 in Lower Shawneetown.

Lower Shawneetown's size and connections to neighboring communities allowed traders to establish storehouses for incoming and outgoing goods, managed by European men who lived in the town year-round and sometimes married Native American women. These trading posts attracted local hunters to bring skins and furs to the town, meaning that a post in Lower Shawneetown could do profitable business with dozens of villages without requiring the traders themselves to travel, as they had done previously. The town's location on the Ohio River allowed traders to send furs and skins by canoe up to Logstown, where they were taken by packhorses over the mountains, transferred into wagons for a fourteen-day journey to Philadelphia and then shipped to London.

On 6 August 1749, Céloron de Blainville met six English traders near Kittanning, who had left Lower Shawneetown and were on their way to Philadelphia with "fifty horses and about one hundred and fifty bales of furs." Father Joseph Bonnecamps examined the furs and described them as the skins of "bears, otters, cats, précans [possibly raccoons], and roe-deer, with the hair retained, for neither martens nor beavers are seen there."

=== Trade goods ===
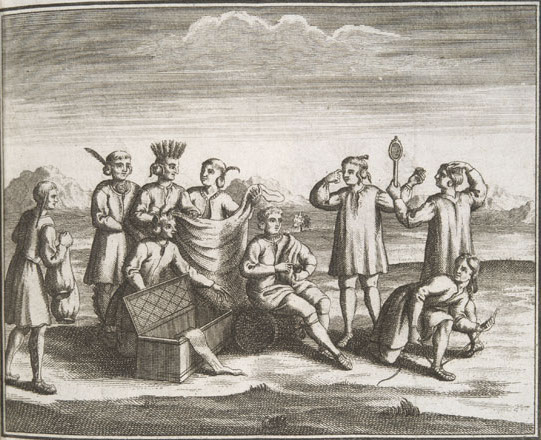
18-century woodcut showing Native Americans with European trade goods that they received in exchange for furs.

Archeological evidence shows that, by the 1750s, trade had transformed the lives of the residents of the town. Traders brought guns, metal tools, knives, saddles, hatchets, glass and ceramic beads, strouds (a kind of coarse blanket), ruffled and plain shirts, coats, clay tobacco pipes, brass and iron pots, and rum to trade for the furs and skins of deer, elk, bison, bear, beaver, raccoon, fox, wildcat, muskrat, mink and fisher. Town residents wore European-style glass beads, silver earrings, armbands, and brooches, rather than traditional Native American beads and pendants made from shell, animal teeth, or animal bone. Cloth matchcoats, wool blankets, linen skirts and shirts and leather shoes supplemented moccasins and garments manufactured from animal skins. Large cast-iron pots began to replace ceramic vessels in the preparation of salt or maple sugar. Strings of glass beads, metal pendants, silver earrings and brooches of European manufacture were buried with the dead. European trade goods found at the site include gun spalls and gunflints, gun parts (sideplate, mainspring, ram pipes, and breech plugs), wire-wound and drawn glass beads, tinkling cones, a button, a brass pendant, an earring, cutlery, kettle ears, a key, nails, chisels, hooks, a buckle, a Jew's harp, and pieces of a pair of iron scissors.

=== Survivors from the raid on Pickawillany ===
On 29 June 1752, William Trent had just left Logstown when he learned of the Raid on Pickawillany, a large Native American village that was attacked by French and Ottawa forces and destroyed. Trent's storehouse there had been plundered. He traveled to Lower Shawneetown, where he met on 3 July in the council-house with Thomas Burney and Andrew McBryer, two English traders who had escaped during the fighting, who gave Trent a full account of the raid. On 4 August 1752, Trent met with a group of survivors from Pickawillany, including the wife and son of Memeskia, the Piankeshaw chief who had been killed in the raid, and presented them with gifts. He engaged in talks with village elders in an attempt to strengthen the alliance between the Shawnees and the British government. He later visited the ruined town to recover what remained of his furs, bringing back what survived for safekeeping in Lower Shawneetown.

=== 1753 floods ===
The portion of Lower Shawneetown east of the Scioto was destroyed by floods in 1753. George Croghan described the event in a journal entry:

On the Ohio, just below the mouth of the Scioto, on a high bank, near forty feet, formerly stood the Shawnesse Town called the Lower Town, which was all carried away, except three or four houses, by a great flood in the Scioto. I was in the town at the time. Though the banks of the Ohio were so high, the water was nine feet [deep] on the top, which obliged the whole Town to take to their canoes, and move with their effects to the hills. The Shawnesse afterwards built their Town on the opposite side of the River, which, during the [French and Indian War], they abandoned...and removed to the Plains of the Scioto.

British traders relocated with the rest of the town's population, intending to maintain their profitable businesses. In the 1918 edition of Narrative of the Life of Mrs. Mary Jemison, George P. Donehoo, Secretary of the Pennsylvania Historical Commission, records:

Shortly after 1753 the village...was destroyed by a flood. The town was then built up on the south side of the Ohio. George Croghan, William Trent and other Indian traders had trading houses at this place. Croghan's large store...was destroyed by the French and Indians in 1754.

=== Expulsion of the English traders, 1754 ===
In 1753, Governor Duquesne sent over two thousand French and Canadian troupes de la marine from New France (in what is now eastern Canada) to the south shore of Lake Erie, under the command of Paul Marin de la Malgue, to build a road and construct a series of forts (Fort Presque Isle, Fort Le Boeuf, and Fort Machault). On 1 September, supplies were sent to this force from Fort de Chartres in Illinois, escorted by one hundred infantry under the command of Captain Demazilière and Lieutenant Portneuf. They reached the falls of the Ohio (the site of present-day Louisville, Kentucky) and Lt. Portneuf was sent on ahead with nine men to see if Marin's troops were further upriver. Portneuf traveled for a week before reaching Lower Shawneetown. He observed English traders living in the town, as well as a few deserters from the French army, "some of whom had taken wives there." Portneuf was invited to a conference with a Shawnee chief, who "advised him to leave, adding that their young men were beginning to lose their minds and wanted to kill him." Portneuf and his men left that night and returned to Fort de Chartres.

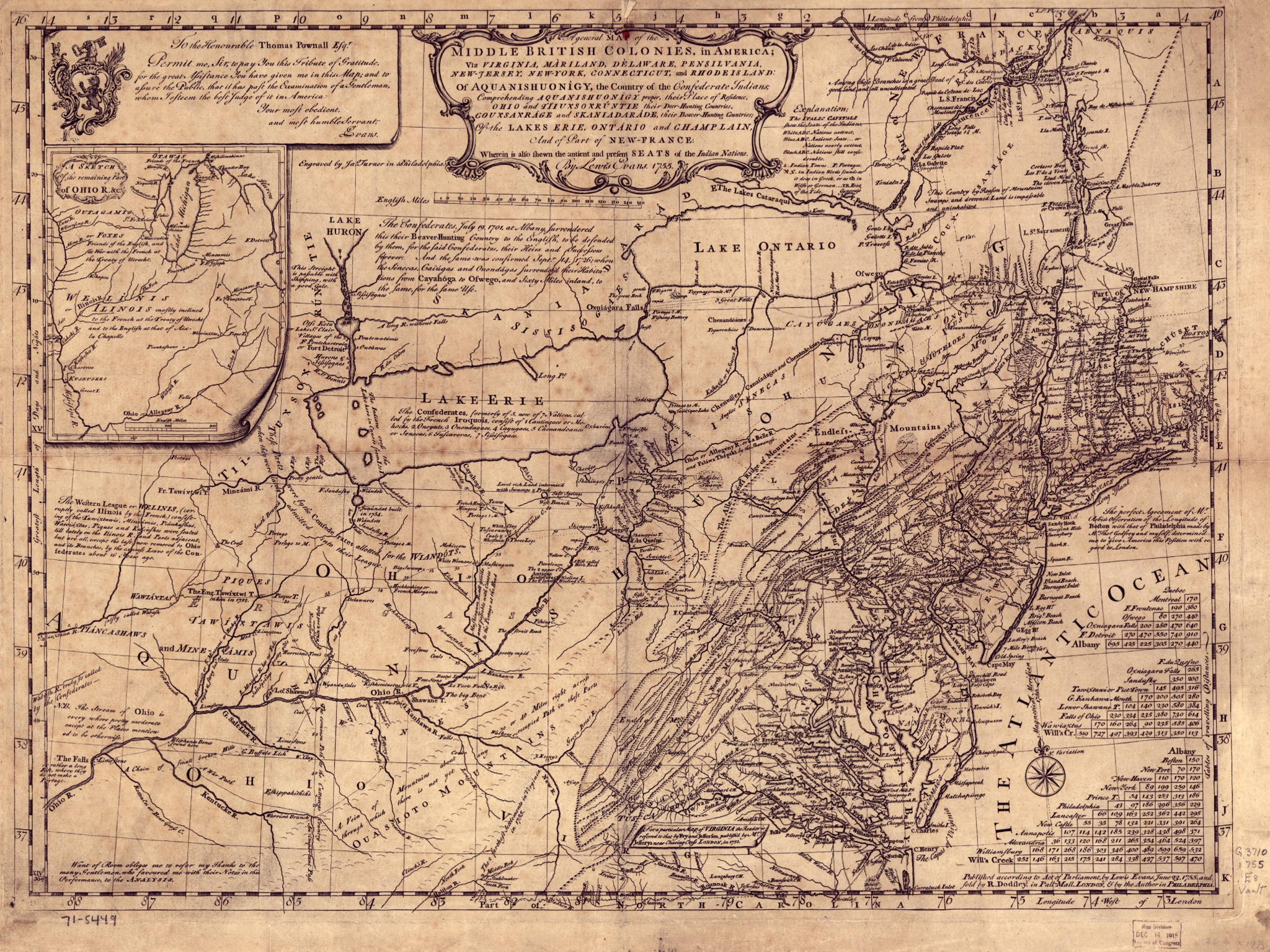
1755 map by Lewis Evans showing "Lor Shawnee T." to the lower left of map's center.

In January, 1754, a Chickasaw man reported a slightly different version of this event to George Croghan:

...We hear that there is a large body of French at the Falls of the Ohio...[with] abundance of Provisions and Powder and Lead with them...coming up the river to meet the Army from Canada coming down. He says a Canoe with Ten French Men in her came up to the Lower Shawonese Town with him, but on some of the English Traders threatening to take them, they set back that night without telling their business.

The Shawnees then learned that "several hundreds" of Ottaway warriors "are gathering together on this side Lake Erie...in order to cutt off the Shawonese at the Lower Shawonese Town. The French and Ottaways offered the hatchet [proposed a military alliance] to the Owendats but they refused to join them."

This threat, plus the presence of French troops in the Ohio Valley as well as French military victories at Fort Prince George and the Battle of Fort Necessity, persuaded the residents of Lower Shawneetown and several other communities that the balance of power was about to change, and they expelled the English traders in 1754, as much for their safety as to indicate that they were showing no favor towards the English. George Croghan reported that he had lost his storehouses and their contents at Pine Creek, Logstown, Muskingum and the newly built storehouse at Lower Shawneetown that he shared with William Trent and Robert Callender: "One large House on the Ohio, opposite to the mouth of the River Scioto, where the Shawanese had built their new Town, called the Lower Shawanese Town, which House we learn by the Indians is now in the possession of a French Trader." Croghan's cornfields, canoes and bateaux were also confiscated and turned over to French traders by the Shawnees. Tanacharison reported that the town's residents "had mutinied and insolently blocked the road."

== Visit by Twightwee leaders, 1754 ==
Following the 1752 raid on Pickawillany and subsequent attacks, the leaders of Lower Shawneetown had refused to join the Twightwee in their fight against the French. Even after the expulsion of the English traders, Lower Shawneetown's chiefs remained stubbornly neutral. In October, 1754, Twightwee leaders visited Lower Shawneetown demanding that Shawnee chiefs support them against the French:

You know that the French have invaded our Country on all Sides; Why do you sit so still? Will you be Slaves to the French, and suffer them to be Masters of all the Land and all the Game? Rise up, take the Hatchet, and follow our Example. We kill'd not long ago, Fifty Frenchmen, all Warriors, in one Day. Five other Nations have join'd us; and if you, and your Grandfathers, the Delaware, will but stir, the French will soon be forced to fly.

Shawnee leaders at Lower Shawneetown replied:

Brethren, the Twightwees, We are surpriz'd at your Request. The Six United Nations have desir'd us to sit still, and not mind the French; and that we must keep our Ears and Eyes towards the Six United Nations; and so do our Grandfathers the Delawares. We desire you would spare us and leave our Town before the French hear of you, and come and kill you here, and plunge us into the War, before the Six United Nations begin it.

== Captives ==
At least nine captives taken during raids on American pioneer settlements are known to have lived in or visited Lower Shawneetown.

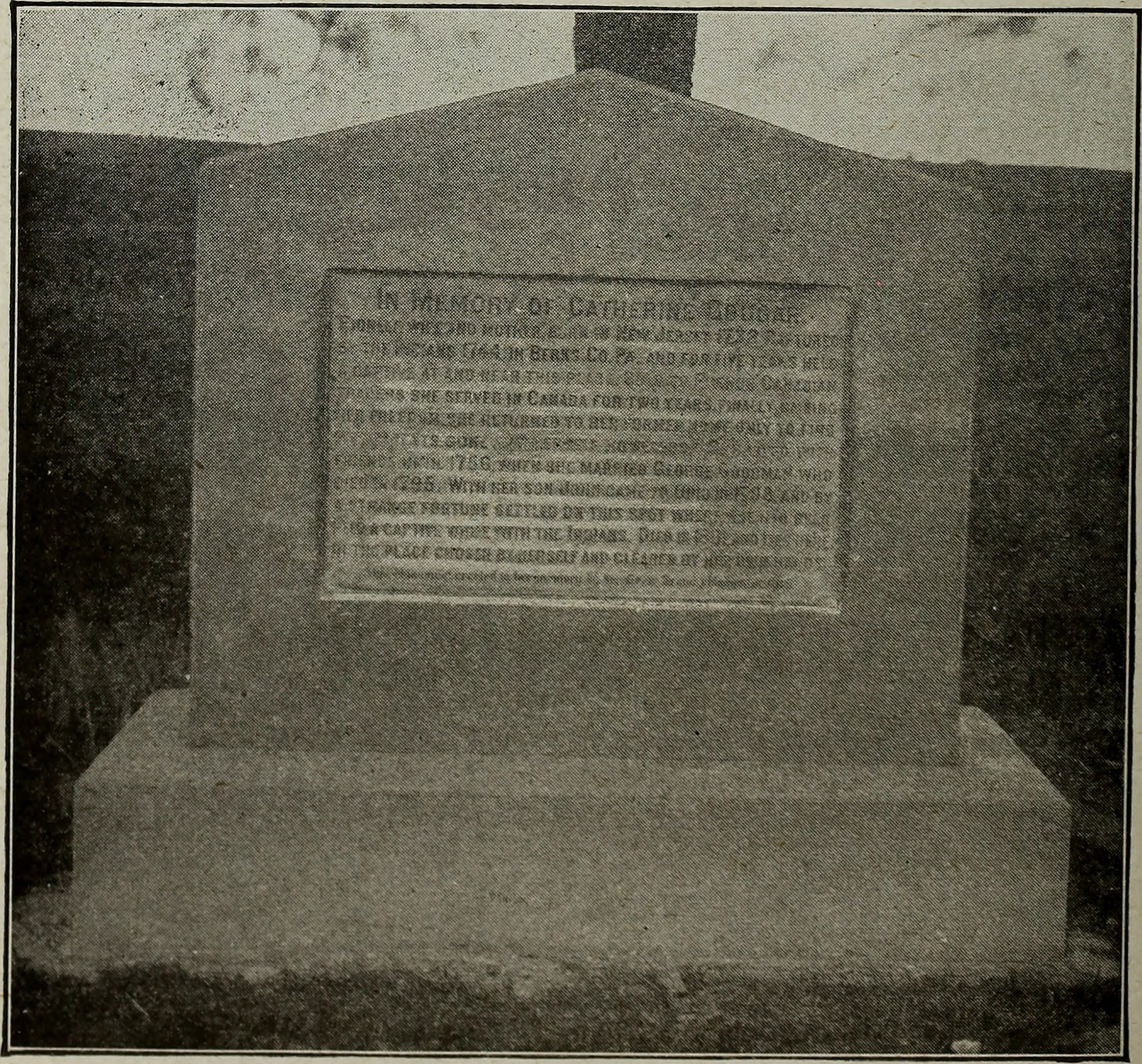
Monument to Catherine Gougar

=== Catherine Gougar ===
Catherine Gougar (1732–1801) was kidnapped in 1744 from her home in Berks County, Pennsylvania and lived in Lower Shawneetown for five years. She was eventually sold to French-Canadian traders and after two more years in Canada, managed to return home in 1751.

=== Mary Draper Ingles ===
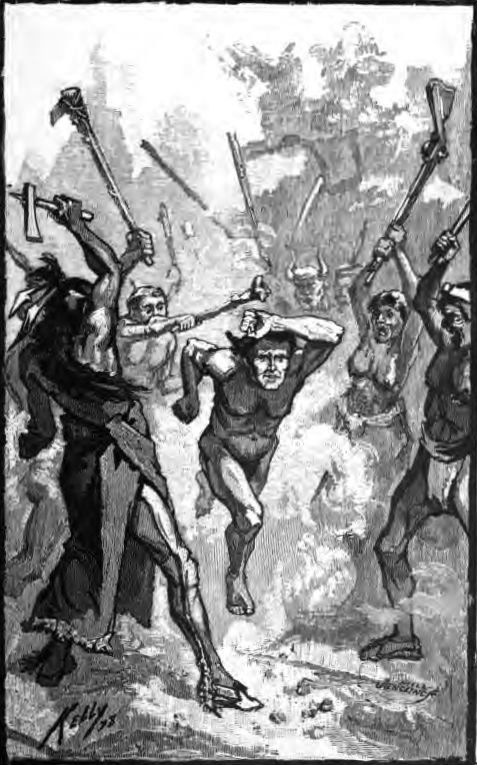
A captive runs the gauntlet between Shawnee warriors.

Mary Draper Ingles (1732–1815) was kidnapped during the Draper's Meadow massacre in July, 1755, along with her two sons, her sister-in-law Bettie Robertson Draper, and her neighbor Henry Lenard (or Leonard), all of whom were taken to Lower Shawneetown. Upon arrival at the town, the prisoners were made to undergo the ritual of running the gauntlet:

When their Warriors arrive within half a Mile of their Towns, it is their custom to whip those who have been so unfortunate as to fall into their Hands, all the Remainder of the Way till they get to the Town, and that it was in this Manner our poor unhappy Neighbors from Virginia had been treated by them.

According to her son John, Mary was not required to do this. Mary stayed in the town for about three weeks, during which time her sons George and Thomas Ingles were taken from her and adopted by Shawnee families. Mary's sister-in-law Bettie was given to a widowed Cherokee chief. French traders were living in the town at that time, selling cloth, and Mary demonstrated her skill in sewing shirts, for which she was paid "in goods." Mary was eventually taken to Big Bone Lick to make salt by boiling brine. She and another captive escaped in mid-October, 1755, and walked several hundred miles to return home. One source states that Mary's neighbor Henry Leonard also escaped.

=== Samuel Stalnaker ===
An article in the New-York Mercury of 16 February 1756, describing Mary's capture and escape, mentions that while in Lower Shawneetown she saw "a considerable Number of English Prisoners, who have been taken Captives from the Frontiers of Virginia." The same newspaper article states that she saw Samuel Stalnaker (1715–1769), who had been captured during a raid on his homestead on the north fork of the Holston River in Virginia on 18 June 1755. Stalnaker escaped on 10 May 1756, and traveled to Williamsburg to warn Governor Robert Dinwiddie of impending attacks on Virginia settlements. On 1 July 1756, the Pennsylvania Gazette reported:

"Williamsburg, June 11 -- Capt. Stalnacker, who was taken Prisoner by the Shawnese, the 18th of June last, on Holston's River, and has been at the Shawnese Town, and Ouabach [Wabash] Fort ever since, till the tenth of last Month, when he made his Escape from them, is come to this Town, and informs us, that on the evening before he made his escape (9 May 1756), 1,000 Indians and six French officers came to the Shawnese Town, destined for Fort Duquesne, to wait there some time to see whether any attempt would be made upon it, and if not, to disperse themselves, and fall upon the Frontiers of Virginia and Pennsylvania."

=== Moses Moore and Isham Bernat ===
Moses Moore and Isham Bernat were captured in Virginia and taken to Lower Shawneetown in early 1758. Bernat was living at his plantation near the Irwin River when he was taken prisoner by a party of Shawnees, Wyandots, Delawares and Mingoes on 31 March 1758. Moore was hunting beaver in Augusta County when he was taken prisoner by a party of Wyandots in April, 1758. They were held for a few days in Lower Shawneetown before being taken to another town. In 1759 they escaped and walked for 23 days to reach Pittsburgh.

== Relocation, 1758 ==
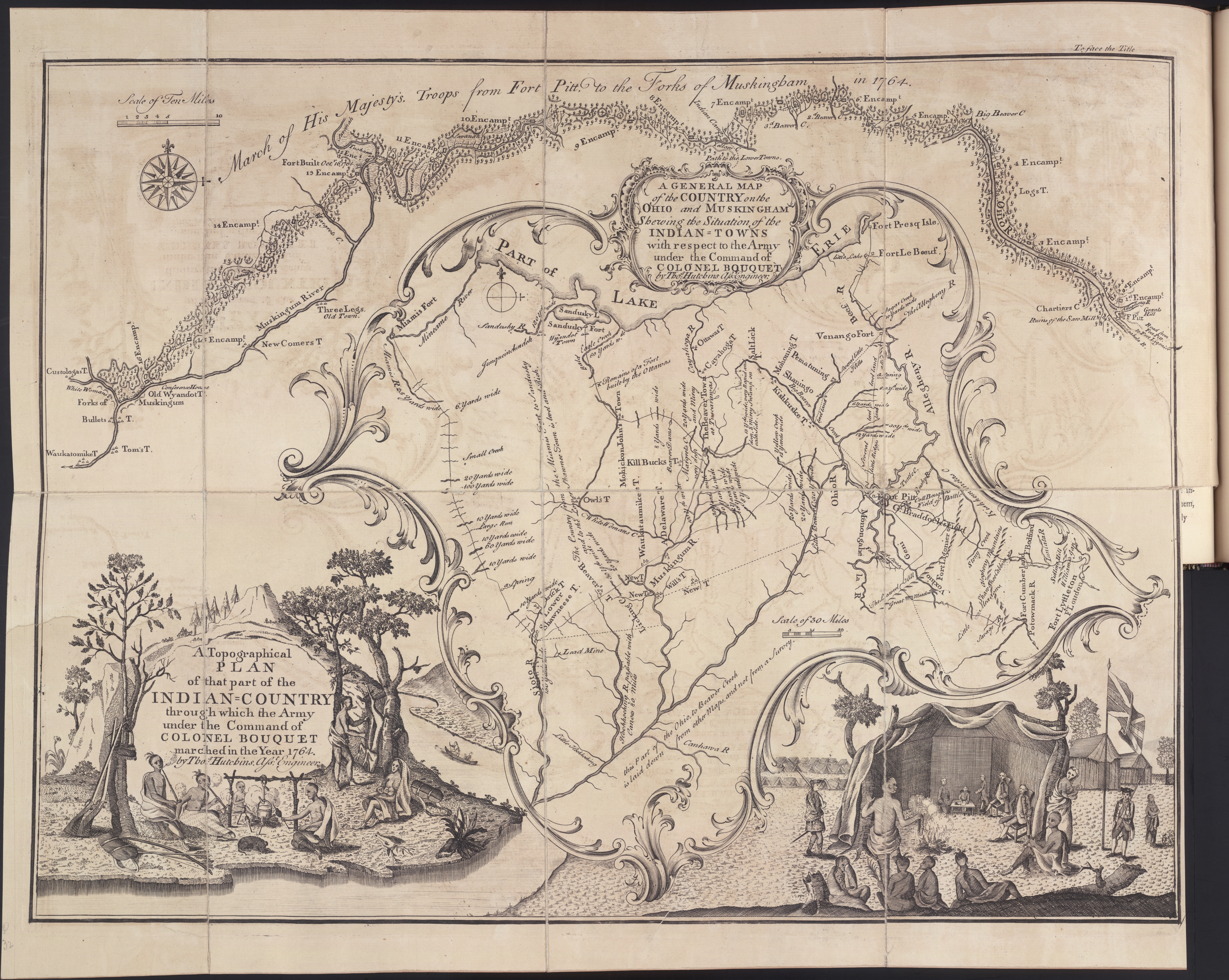
1764 map showing the site of the relocated "Lower Shawneese Town" on the upper Scioto (spelled Sioto here), seen just below the center of the page, where Chillicothe, Ohio was later built.

Lower Shawneetown was moved upriver to the Pickaway Plains in 1758 during the French and Indian War because the Shawnees were, in George Croghan's words, in "fear of the Virginians." This was possibly a reference to the failed Sandy Creek Expedition of spring, 1756, in which several companies of Virginia Rangers and a group of Cherokee warriors had marched up the Big Sandy River, intending to attack Lower Shawneetown. Harsh weather and lack of food forced them to turn back before they reached the town.

In his journal under the date 28 November 1758, Croghan writes:

Set off at seven o'clock, in company with six Delawares, and that night arrived at Logs Town, which we found deserted by its late inhabitants. On inquiring the reason of their speedy flight, the Delawares informed me the Lower Shanoes [inhabitants of Lower Shawneetown] had removed off the River up Sihotta [Sciota], to a great plain called Moguck, and sent for those that lived here to come there and live with them, and quit the French, and at the same time the deputies of the Six Nations, which I had sent from Easton, came and hastened their departure.

When Mary Jemison, a captive of the Seneca, spent the winter at the mouth of the Scioto River in 1758–1759, Lower Shawneetown had been abandoned and relocated further up the Scioto River. This new village was Chalahgawtha at the site of present-day Chillicothe, Ohio.

James Everett Seaver, who co-authored Narrative of the Life of Mrs. Mary Jemison (1824), says:

In 1758, the first year of Mary Jemison's going there, the Shawnees moved their town (the Lower Shawnee Town) from the mouth of the Scioto to the upper plains of the Scioto, sending for the Shawnees of Logstown to join them there and possibly also for the Shawnees of the [Upper] Shawnee Town at the mouth of the Great Kanawha to do the same.

== Legacy ==
Thomas Hutchins' 1778 map of Virginia, Pennsylvania, Maryland, and North Carolina shows both the relocated "Lower Shawanoe T." on the upper Scioto (upper right quadrant of map), as well as the "Old Shawanoe T." at the mouth of the Scioto on the Ohio River (to the right of map's center).

A. Gwynn Henderson argues that multiethnic "supervillages" such as Lower Shawneetown might be considered early Native American city-states because of their political autonomy and the new opportunities they created for different tribes as well as for the interaction of Native Americans with Europeans. Trade with other tribes led to intermarriage and increased ethnic diversity.

Lower Shawneetown's diversity prevented it from operating as a political entity, however. Independent factions, themselves often divided, responded individually to events, to the frustration of European envoys. Community leaders were rarely able to unify a majority in backing policy decisions, which prevented Europeans from establishing firm diplomatic relations with Lower Shawneetown as they did (to some extent) at Logstown.

=== Portsmouth floodwall murals ===
In 1992 muralist Robert Dafford was commissioned to create a series of murals depicting the history of Portsmouth, Ohio, on the floodwall, built in 1937 to protect the city from periodic floods after the Ohio River flood of 1937. Between 1992 and 2003 Dafford created 65 paintings covering Ohio history from the Hopewell mound builders to the present day. The first mural shows how the Hopewell mounds near Portsmouth might have appeared soon after their construction. The second mural depicts Lower Shawneetown as it might have appeared on a winter day in 1730. The third mural shows Pierre-Joseph Céloron de Blainville meeting with Native American residents of Lower Shawneetown and a few British traders during his visit on 25 August 1749.

== Lower Shawneetown Archeological District ==
The Lower Shawneetown Archeological District, in Greenup County, Kentucky and Lewis County, Kentucky near South Portsmouth, is a 335 acres (1.36 km^{2}) historic district which was listed on the National Register of Historic Places in 1985. The site was listed for its information potential and includes the Lower Shawneetown village site, human burials, and five more contributing sites: the Bentley site, Forest Home, Laughlin, Thompson, and Old Fort Earthworks, based on ancient artifact assemblages and radiocarbon dating. The district includes the Portsmouth Earthworks, one of the largest earthwork ceremonial centers constructed by the Ohio Hopewell culture mound builder indigenous peoples between 100 BCE and 500 CE.

The Kentucky portion of the site was initially discovered in the 1920s during road construction. It was investigated at that time by a team from the University of Kentucky, however Fort Ancient materials recovered from the site were not analyzed until the 1960s. Sites on both sides of the Ohio River were excavated again between 1984 and 1987 and all have produced Late Fort Ancient Montour Phase (1550 to 1750) artifacts, including mid-18th century Euro-American trade goods and human and animal remains.

== See also ==
- Logstown
- Pickawillany
- Kittanning (village)
- Kuskusky
- Sandy Creek Expedition
