= South Portsmouth, Kentucky =

Unincorporated community in Kentucky, United States

- Unincorporated community
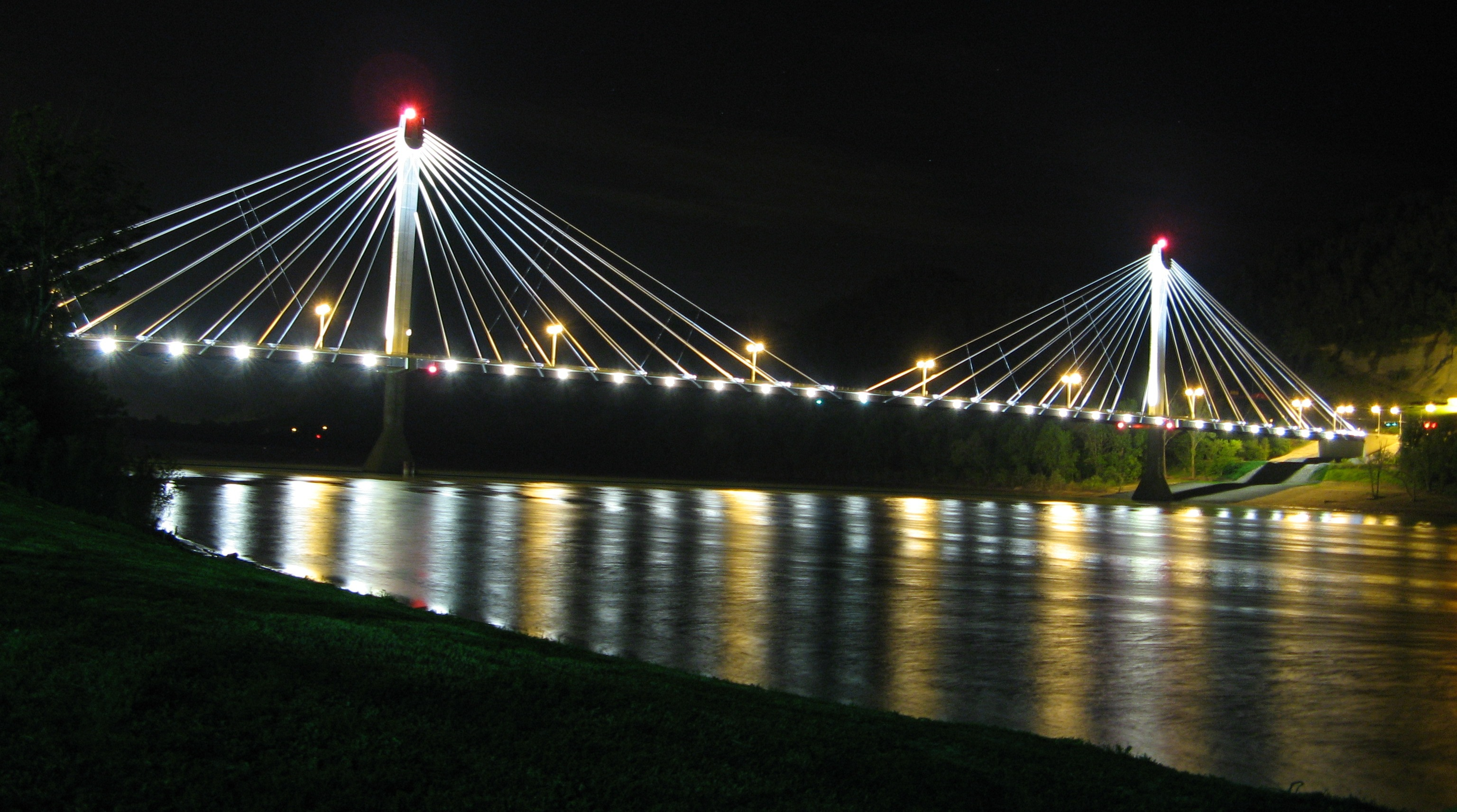
- The U.S. Grant Bridge between Portsmouth and South Portsmouth

- Location within Kentucky Location within the United States
- Coordinates: 38°43′28″N 83°00′48″W
- Country: United States
- State: Kentucky
- County: Greenup
- Elevation: 554 ft (169 m)
- Time zone: UTC-5 (Eastern (EST))
  - Summer (DST): UTC-4 (EDT)
- ZIP code: 41174
- Area code: 606
- GNIS feature ID: 503970

South Portsmouth is an unincorporated community in Greenup County, Kentucky, United States. South Portsmouth is located on the Ohio River across from Portsmouth, Ohio and 3 miles (4.8 km) west of South Shore, Kentucky. Kentucky Route 8 passes through the community.

South Portsmouth was originally called Springville due to the numerous springs in the area. Springville was incorporated as a town on March 3, 1876. The Chesapeake and Ohio Railway built a track through the community in the early 1900s. Subsequently, the name of the community was changed to South Portsmouth, presumably to indicate its location and strengthen its connection with Portsmouth, Ohio, a city of more than 20,000 people.

An Amtrak train station, South Portsmouth-South Shore station, was formerly located in South Portsmouth. The station was moved to South Shore as part of the construction of the Carl D. Perkins Memorial Bridge.

South Portsmouth is the site of an 18th-century Shawnee Indian village called Lower Shawneetown.

== Notable person ==
- Charles Kinney (1850–1918) - Ohio Secretary of State
