= Hardin Village site =

Archaeological site in Kentucky, US

Hardin Village Site
- Location within Kentucky today
- 38°44′30.95″N 82°54′53.60″W
- Periods: Montour Phase (AD 1550 to 1750)
- Cultures: Fort Ancient culture
- Location: South Shore, Kentucky, Greenup County, Kentucky, US
- Region: Greenup County, Kentucky

History
- Built: Early AD 1550s
- Abandoned: AD 1625

Site notes
- Excavation dates: 1930s

The Hardin Village Site (15GP22) is a Fort Ancient culture Montour Phase archaeological site located on a terrace of the Ohio River near South Shore in Greenup County, Kentucky. It is located within the Big Sandy Management Area along with the nearby Lower Shawneetown Site. The site was first inhabited sometime in the early 16th century and abandoned by 1625. This era of protohistory saw the arrival of Europeans in North America, although by the time they made it to this area, the village had been long abandoned.

== Site ==
The Hardin Village Site is located on the large flat 2 kilometres (1.2 mi) wide floodplain terrace of the Ohio River, a little over 3 miles (4.8 km) from present day South Shore, Kentucky. It was occupied from sometime in the early 16th century and abandoned by about 1625, during the Montour Phase of the Fort Ancient chronology. During its occupation it covered an area of about 4.5-hectare (45,000 m^{2}) and measured 160 metres (520 ft) on its east–west axis and 300 metres (980 ft) on its north–south axis. Like other Fort Ancient villages it had a defensive palisade surrounding it, but unlike other sites it does not seem to have had a central oval plaza. In most other towns of the culture the houses would face into the oval plaza, but at Hardin they seem to have been arranged in clusters, although this may actually be the result of the rebuilding of a new houses in the same general location as the older demolished houses. Houses were built using the single set post method, meaning each individual post was set in its own individual hole, then the rectangular structure was covered in bark, thatch, or skins, probably resembling Iroquoian longhouses . Interior posts helped to support the roof and storage pits lined the interior of the walls. Thin partitions divided the large structures into multi-family dwellings. A gap between two larger posts set on the river sides of the houses was used as the doorway. The houses could be quite large, some measuring up to 9.1 metres (30 ft) by 21.5 metres (71 ft), but the average size was 132.9 square metres (1,431 sq ft).

== Material culture ==
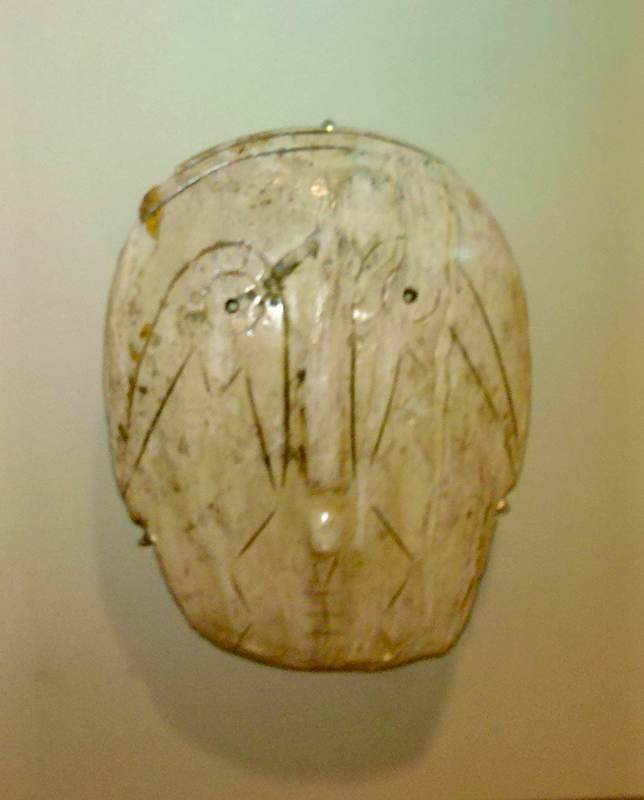
Mississippian shell gorget from the Hardin Village Site

As with other peoples of the era, mussel shells from local stream were used for tools and jewelry. Animal bone and shell attached to prepared tree limbs were also used for hoes in their gardens. Animal bone was shaped for use as tools. These included awls, punches, fish hooks, bone needles, and hide scrapers. Their jewelry included beads, hair pins, pendants, tinklers, and bone and shell gorgets. Gourds from their garden and turtle shell were used for ceremonial rattles.

=== Ceramics ===
Pottery at the Hardin site was similar to that made and found at other Fort Ancient sites. Women would use ground mussel shell as a tempering agent, it was added to wet clay and finely kneaded in. This technique of using ground mussel shell is a hallmark of Mississippian cultures to the south and west of the Fort Ancient, and displays how they were influenced by that culture. The clay would then be rolled into strips and layered and smoothed to form the appropriate shapes. It was then decorated with a variety of methods such as engraving designs with a sharpened stick, cordmarking with twine, stamping, and beating with a wooden paddle. The majority of the pottery found at the site is of the Madisonville-Fox Farm Cordmarked(about 75% of examples) and Madisonville Plain, with Fox Farm Saltpan, Madisonville Groove Paddled, Madisonville Net-Impressed and Fox Farm Check Stamped showing up as minor types. These decorations and shapes were unique to Fort Ancient culture and are used as diagnostic tools for identifying their sites, which period in the chronology the sites are from and which other groups they interacted with the most.

=== Mortuary practices ===
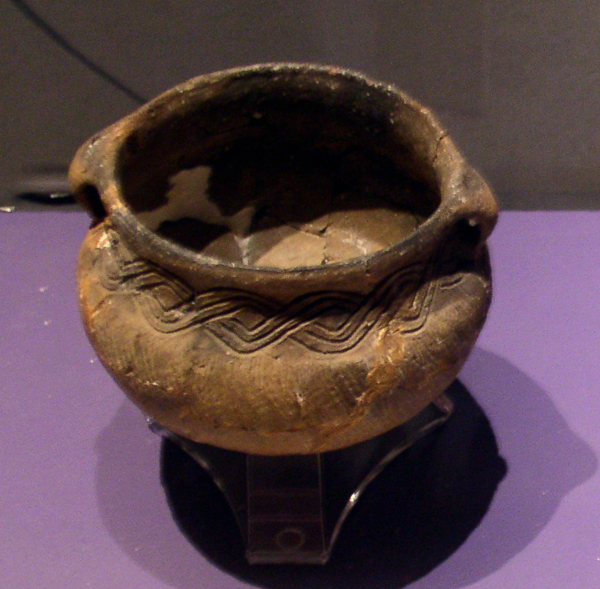
A typical piece of Fort Ancient pottery

Burials for the village would be made in designated areas of the village. A total of 301 to 445 burials have been found at the site by archaeologists, the largest number of burials found in a Kentucky Fort Ancient site. Most of these burials were in the extended position, stretched straight out. A small percentage of burials at the site have been of other types, including in the flexed position (with the knees drawn up), bundle burials (excarnated bones reburied as a bundle) and graves with stone slabs. About half of the burials contained grave goods, including pottery and stone tools. These utilitarian wares were more often interred with adults. Exotic goods were more likely to be interred with children up to about 4 years old (excluding those 1 year old or less) and adults over about 50, with males being buried with nonlocal engraved shell ornaments, hematite and metal objects made from brass tubes and copper from European sources. These exotic trade objects came by way of Mississippian culture peoples to the south and west of the Fort Ancient peoples. By the time French and English explorers reached the area, the village had long been abandoned.

Analysis of these burials has shown that Fort Ancient peoples were not as healthy as their less agrarian ancestors, a byproduct of their heavy dependence on maize agriculture. The chronic malnutrition and niacin deficiency caused by the eating of maize as their major food source caused many of the Fort Ancient peoples to have high rates of arthritis, dental diseases, lower life expectancies and a high infant mortality. This chronic malnutrition also made them prone to other infections, such as tuberculosis (which only a few specimens exhibited) and treponematosis (a non venereal form of yaws or syphilis) a disease which many were found to have been afflicted with.

== Excavations ==
The site was excavated in the late 1930s, again in 1966 and, most recently, in 2015 by archaeologists from the University of Kentucky.
