= List of Adena culture sites =

This is a list of Adena culture sites. The Adena culture was a Pre-Columbian Native American culture that started during the latter end of the early Woodland Period (1000 to 200 BCE) . The Adena culture existed from 500 BC into the First Century CE and refers to what were probably a number of related Native American societies sharing a burial complex and ceremonial system. The Adena lived in a variety of locations, including: Ohio, Indiana, West Virginia, Kentucky, and parts of Pennsylvania and New York.

Site	Image	Description
Adena Mound (Ross County, Ohio)	Adena Mound (Ross County, Ohio)	Adena Mound, the type site for the culture, a registered historic structure near Chillicothe, Ohio.
Arledge Mounds I and II		An unusual pair of conjoined mounds in the south central part of the state of Ohio, located near Circleville in Pickaway County.
Biggs site	Biggs site	The site, located in Greenup County, Kentucky, is an earthen mound surrounded by a concentric causewayed circular embankment and ditch. It is connected to the Portsmouth Earthworks directly across the Ohio River in Portsmouth, Ohio.
Conrad Mound Archeological Site		Located east of Cleves in Hamilton County, Ohio.
Criel Mound	Criel Mound	A 35-foot-high (11 m) and 175-foot-diameter (53 m) conical mound, is the second largest of its type in West Virginia. It is located in South Charleston, West Virginia. P. W. Norris of the Smithsonian Institution oversaw the excavation. His team discovered numerous skeletons along with weapons and jewelry.
Dayton Power and Light Company Mound	Dayton Power and Light Company Mound	Located within the Killen Station power generating plant, east of Wrightsville, Ohio in Adams County, Ohio. Added to the National Register of Historic Places in 1974.
George Deffenbaugh Mound		Located northeast of Laurelville in Hocking County, Ohio.
Enon Mound	Enon Mound	Ohio's second largest conical burial mound, it is believed to have been built by the Adena.
Gaitskill Mound	Gaitskill Mound	An earthwork attributed to the Adena culture and located in Mount Sterling, Kentucky at coordinates 38.072481°N 83.950783°W.
Grave Creek Mound	Grave Creek Mound	At 69 feet (21 m) high and 295 feet (90 m) in diameter, is the largest conical-type burial mound in the United States. It is located in Moundsville, West Virginia. In 1838, much of the archaeological evidence in this mound was destroyed when several non-archaeologists tunneled into the mound.
Great Mound		Located in Section 19 of Madison Township in Butler County, Ohio, with a height of 88 feet (27 m) and a circumference of 511 feet (156 m).
Hansen site		Located in near South Portsmouth in Greenup County, Kentucky. The 6-hectare (15-acre) site is on a flood terrace of the Ohio River across from the mouth of the Scioto River, just upstream from the Lower Shawneetown site and the Old Fort Earthworks. The site was occupied several times over the centuries, with occupations dating from the Late Archaic (2000 BCE), Middle Woodland (300 to 600 CE), and Fort Ancient periods.
Highbanks Metropolitan Park Mounds I and II		Two subconical mounds located within Highbanks Metro Park in Delaware County, Ohio.
Horn Mound		Located near the village of Tarlton in eastern Pickaway County, Ohio.
Kinzer Mound		Located outside of the village of South Salem in Ross County, Ohio.
Luthor List Mound	Luthor List Mound	Also known as the "Burning Mound" or the "Signal Mound" and located in Pickaway County, Ohio near the city of Circleville along the Kingston Pike, southeast of Circleville in Circleville Township.
Miamisburg Mound	Miamisburg Mound	Once serving as an ancient burial site, the Mound is the most recognizable landmark in Miamisburg, Ohio. It is the largest conical burial mound in Ohio, and remains virtually intact. Located in a city park at 900 Mound Avenue, it is an Ohio historical site and serves as a popular attraction and picnic destination for area families. The modern addition of stone-masonry steps allows visitors to climb to the top of the mound.
Mound Cemetery (Marietta, Ohio)	Mound Cemetery mound, known as the Great Mound or Conus.	Mound Cemetery in Marietta, Ohio is an historic cemetery developed around the base of a prehistoric Adena burial mound known as the Great Mound or Conus. The cemetery was established in 1801 by townspeople in order to protect the mound.
Mounds State Park	Mounds State Park	Mounds State Park is a state park in Anderson, Indiana, featuring prehistoric Native American heritage, and 10 ceremonial mounds built by the Adena culture people and also used by later Hopewell inhabitants.
Mount Horeb Site 1	Mount Horeb Site 1	The center piece of the University of Kentuckys Adena Park in Fayette County, Kentucky. It is located on a bank 75 feet (23 m) above Elkhorn Creek. It is a perfectly circular 105 feet (32 m) diameter platform, surrounded by a 45 feet (14 m) wide ditch and a 13 feet (4.0 m) wide enclosure with a 33 feet (10 m) wide entryway facing to the west.
Peter Village enclosure	Peter Village enclosure	Located in Fayette County, Kentucky near the Mount Horeb Site 1. The site as a twenty sided icosogonal polygon 3,767 feet (1,148 m) long with a 15 feet (4.6 m) wide 4 feet (1.2 m) to 8 feet (2.4 m) deep ditch surrounding it.
Odd Fellows' Cemetery Mound		Located in the village of Newtown in Hamilton County, Ohio.
Old Maid's Orchard Mound		An 8 feet (2.4 m) tall burial mound located near the village of Lithopolis in Fairfield County, Ohio, within the boundaries of Chestnut Ridge Metro Park, in northern Bloom Township.
Orators Mound	Orators Mound	Located along the Inman Trail of Glen Helen Nature Preserve near Yellow Springs in Greene County, Ohio.
Carl Potter Mound	Carl Potter Mound	Also known as "Hodge Mound II", is in southeastern Champaign County, Ohio. A very low mound, due to agricultural activity in the past.
Ramey Mound		Surviving component of an earthworks complex in Bath County, Kentucky.
Reeves Mound		Located in the southeastern part of Ohio, north of the unincorporated community of Alfred, in Meigs County.
Rock Eagle	Rock Eagle Effigy Mound	In Putnam County, Georgia, sometimes attributed to members of the Adena culture.
Rock Hawk Effigy Mound	Rock Hawk Effigy Mound	In Putnam County, Georgia, sometimes attributed to members of the Adena culture.
D.S. Rose Mound		Also known as the "Holloway Mound", it was in the southwestern part of Ohio, located north of Huntsville in Butler County. Destroyed in 1991.
Ross Trails Adena Circle		A registered historic site near Ross, Ohio.
Round Hill Mound	Round Hill Mound	Earthwork attributed to the Adena culture located in Madison County, Kentucky at Round Hill.
Short Woods Park Mound		Located in the Sayler Park neighborhood of the city of Cincinnati, Ohio.
Shrum Mound		Earthwork located in Columbus, Ohio.
Snead Mound		Located atop a bluff off U.S. Route 52 near the community of Neville in Clermont County, Ohio. It is a conical mound measuring approximately 5 feet (1.5 m) high and 55 feet (17 m) in diameter at the base.
Spruce Run Earthworks		Earthwork located in Delaware County, Ohio.
David Stitt Mound		Sub-conical mound located near Chillicothe in Ross County, Ohio.
Story Mound (Cincinnati, Ohio)		Located in the Sayler Park neighborhood of the city of Cincinnati, Ohio.
Story Mound State Memorial		Story Mound is a large, conical burial mound built circa 800 BCE to 100 CE. Originally, it was 25 feet (7.6 m) tall and 125 feet (38 m) in diameter. It is similar in size to the Adena Mound and it is located in Ross County, Ohio about one mile southeast of the Adena State Memorial.
Wamsley Village Burial Mounds		Located in Wamsley Village, Ohio in Adams County, Ohio. Archeology was conducted and a number of burials were discovered. The site remains preserved today. Added to the National Register of Historic Places in 1974.
Wolf Plains Group	Wolf Plains Group	A Late Adena group of 30 earthworks including 22 conical mounds and nine circular enclosures. located a few miles to the northwest of Athens, Ohio.
Zaleski Mound Group	Ranger Station Mound of the Zaleski Mound Group	A collection of three burial mounds in the village of Zaleski, Ohio.

== See also ==
- Adena culture
- Hopewell tradition
- Fort Ancient culture
