= Timber circle =

Rings of upright wooden posts

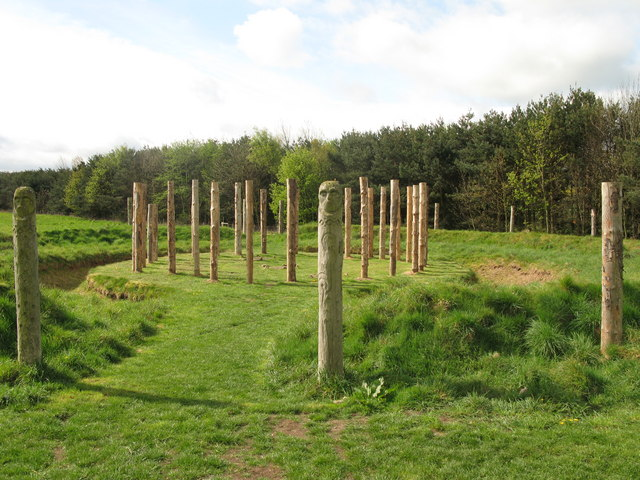
Maelmin Henge, a reconstructed timber circle in England

In archaeology, timber circles are rings of upright wooden posts, built mainly by ancient peoples in the British Isles and North America. They survive only as gapped rings of post-holes, with no evidence they formed walls, making them distinct from palisades. Like stone circles, it is believed their purpose was ritual, ceremonial, and/or astronomical. Sometimes in North America they are referred to as woodhenge.

== British Isles ==
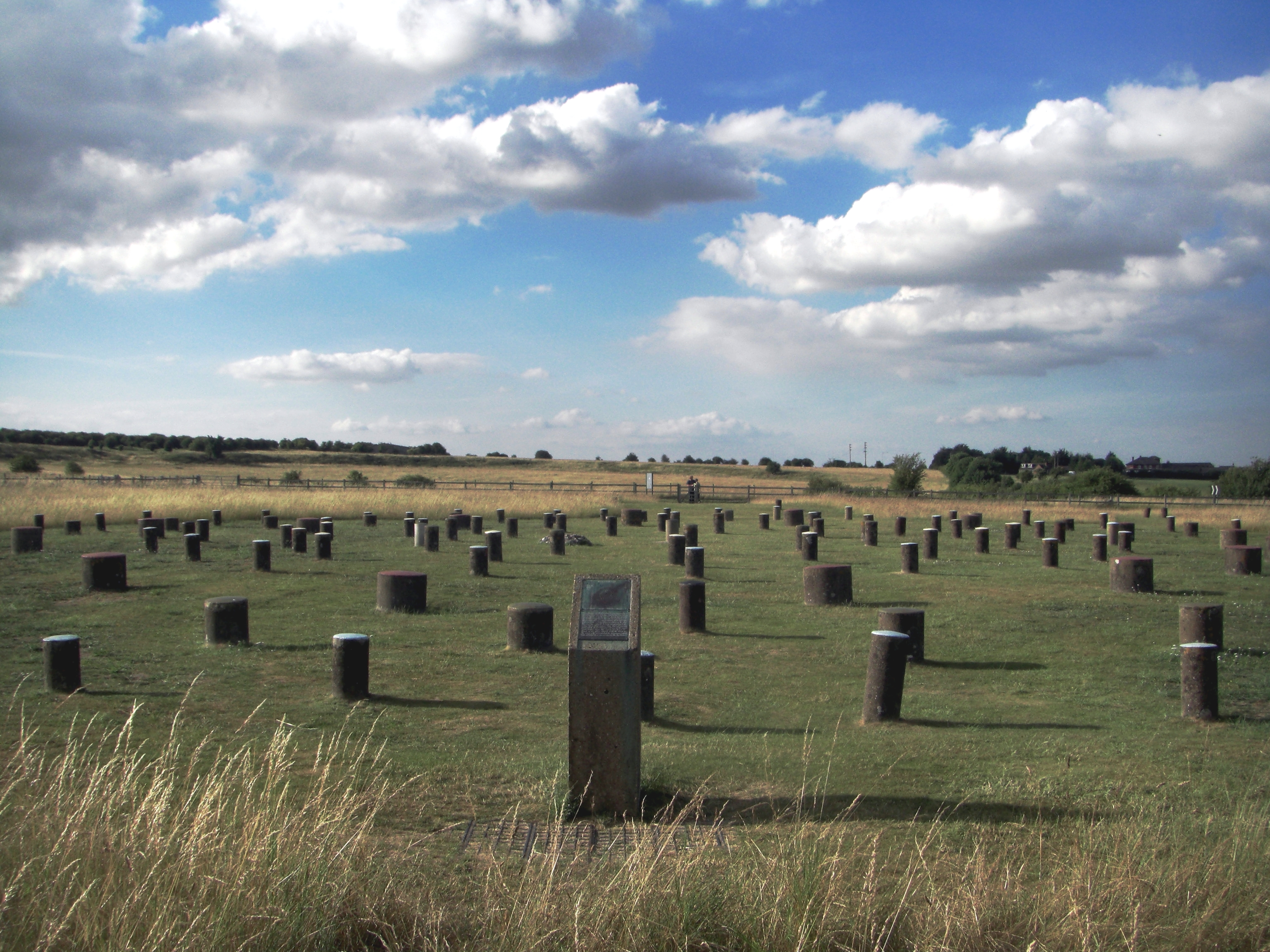
Modern pillars marking the post-holes of Woodhenge, facing northwards

Timber circles in the British Isles date to the late Neolithic and early Bronze Age. The posts themselves have long since disappeared and the sites are identified from the rings of postholes that they stood in. Aerial photography and geophysical survey have led to the discovery of increasing numbers of the features. Often a postpipe survives in the posthole fill aiding diagnosis.

They are usually more than 20 metres (66 ft), and up to 60 metres (200 ft), in diameter and the posts that constituted them were generally more than 50 centimetres (20 in) wide. Often they consist of at least two rings or ovals of timber posts, although some consist of only one ring. Wider gaps between the posts are thought to have served as entrance routes. The builders replaced the posts as they decomposed and in some cases stone circles were adopted instead during later phases.

They appear either alone or in the context of other monuments, namely henges, such as that at Woodhenge and henge enclosures such as those at Durrington Walls. The only excavated examples of timber circles that stood alone from other features are Seahenge and Arminghall in Norfolk and the early phases of The Sanctuary in Wiltshire.

Several Early Bronze Age timber circles have been found in Ireland. A huge timber circle with a diameter of 250 metres (820 ft) was built around a passage tomb on the Hill of Tara. Smaller timber circles were built at sites including Newgrange and Navan.

Timber circles in the British Isles likely served ritual purposes. Animal bone and domestic waste found at many timber circle sites implies some form of temporary habitation and seasonal feasting. They were built on high ground and would have been very conspicuous. Isolated burials have been found at some sites, but not enough to suggest a strong funerary purpose.

== United States ==
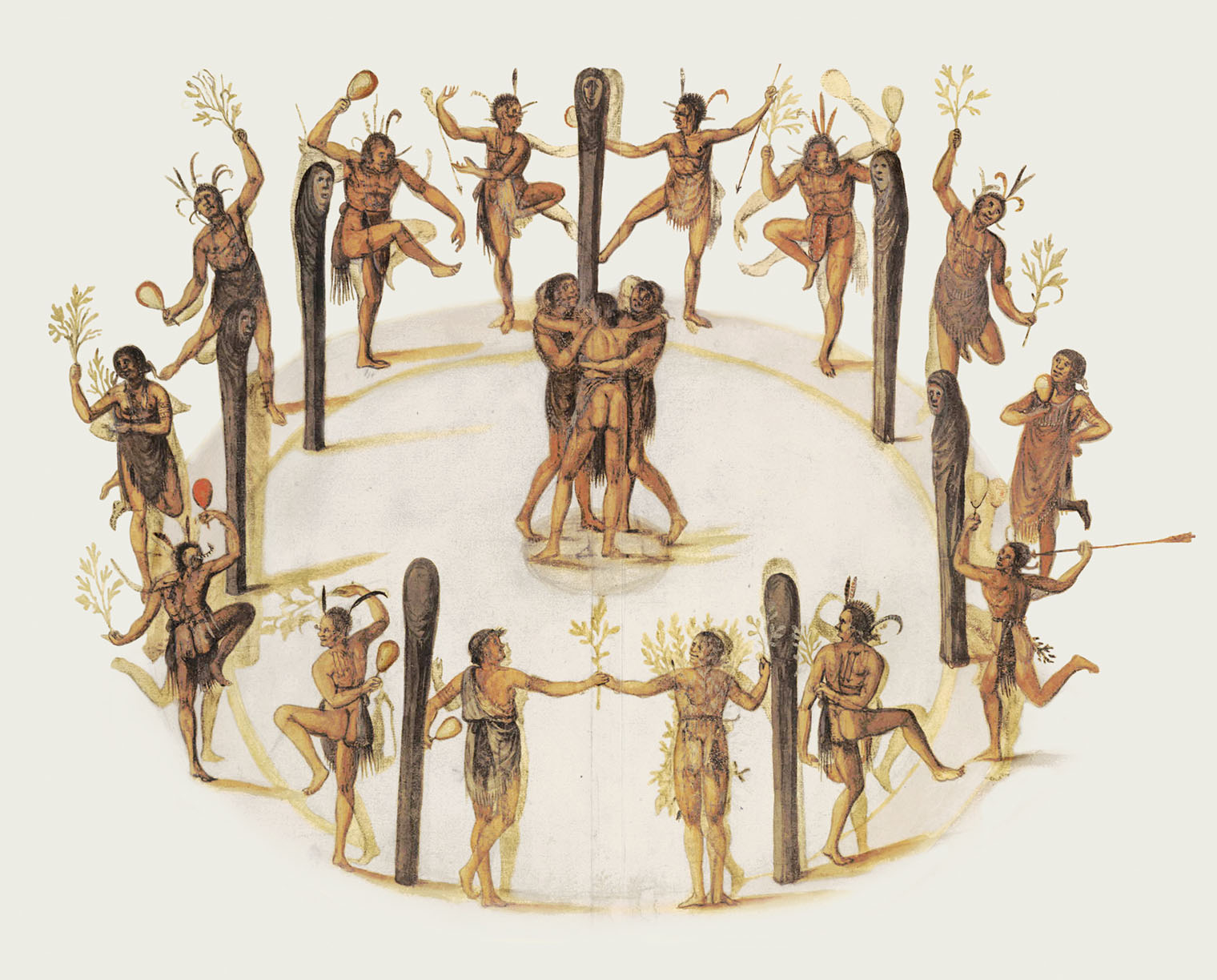
Secotans dancing in a timber circle in North Carolina, watercolor painted by John White in 1585

Timber circles have a long history among Native American societies; their use stretches back for thousands of years and continues into the present day. From the 3400 year old Archaic period Poverty Point site in Louisiana to 2000 year old Hopewell tradition circles found in Ohio to the Sun Dance performed in wooden pole "corrals" by the Dhegihan-Siouan and Caddoan speaking peoples of the Great Plains.

An early example of a timber circle witnessed by Europeans was recorded by watercolor artist John White in July 1585 when he visited the Algonquian village of Secotan in North Carolina. White was the artist-illustrator and mapmaker for the Roanoke Colony expedition sent by Sir Walter Raleigh to begin the first attempts at British colonization of the Americas. White's works represent the sole-surviving visual record of the native inhabitants of the Americas as encountered by England's first colonizers on the Atlantic seaboard. White's watercolor and the writings of the chronicler who accompanied him, Thomas Harriot, describes a great religious festival, possibly the Green Corn ceremony, with participants holding a ceremonial dance at a timber circle. The posts of the circle were carved with faces. Harriot noted that many of the participants had come from surrounding villages and that "every man attyred in the most strange fashion they can devise havinge certayne marks on the backs to declare of what place they bee." and that "Three of the fayrest Virgins" danced around a central post at the center of the timber circle.

=== Poverty Point ===
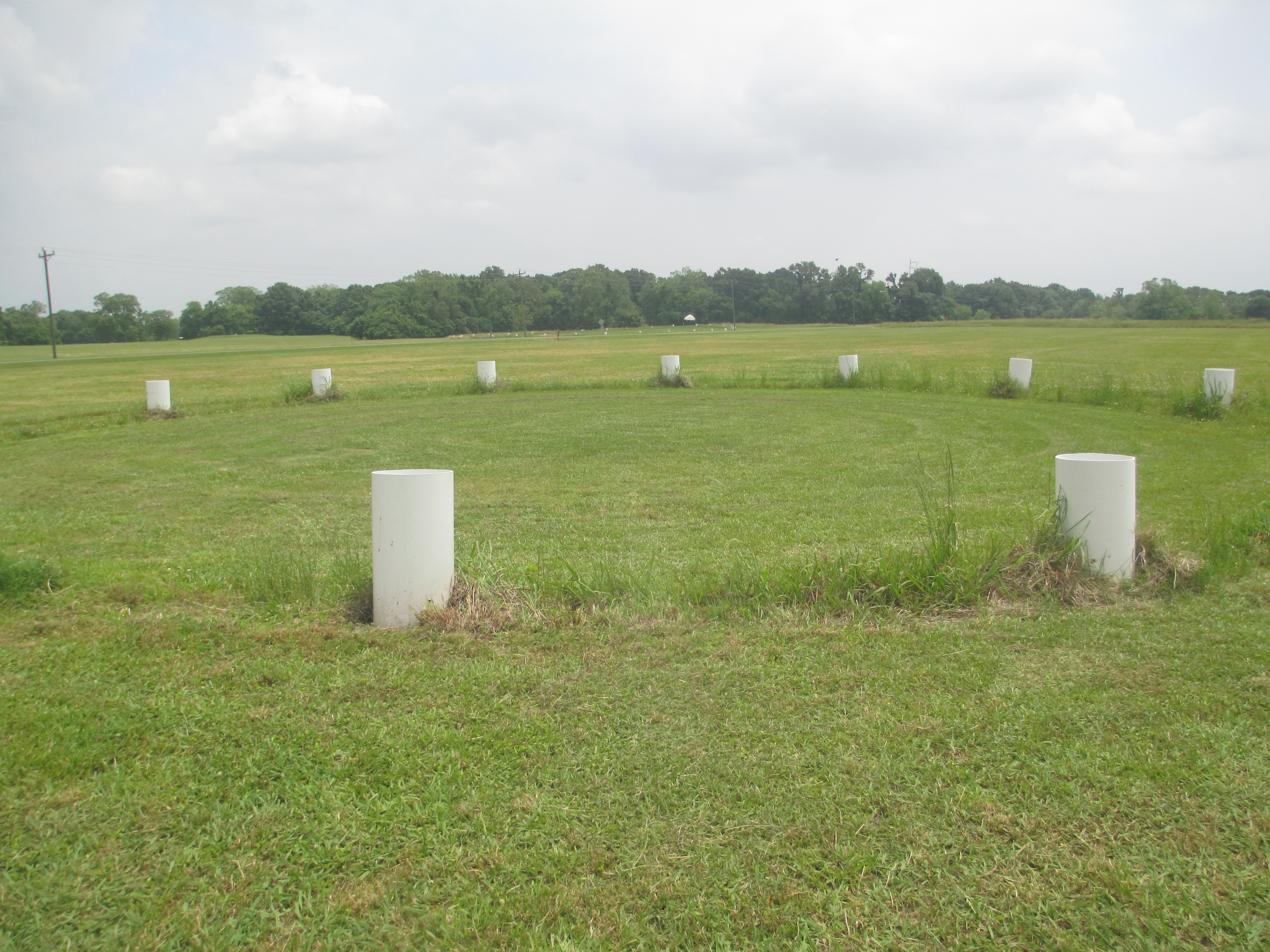
Concrete markers in the plaza area at Poverty Point

The oldest known timber circles in North American archaeology were found at Poverty Point in 2009 by archaeologists from the University of Louisiana at Monroe and Mississippi State University, led by Poverty Point station archaeologist Dr. Diana Greenlee. They discovered evidence in the 37.5 acres (15.2 ha) plaza area for multiple wooden post circular structures ranging from 82 feet (25 m) to 206 feet (63 m) in diameter; built during the earliest habitation of the site circa 2400 BCE. The site now has a ring of concrete posts marking the position of one of the circles.

=== Adena timber circles ===
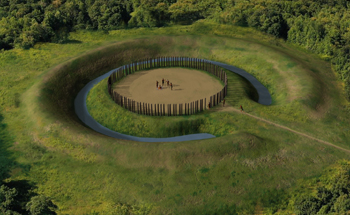
Artists conception of Mt Horeb Site 1

Postholes from a number of timber circles have been found during excavations of Adena culture causewayed ring ditch sites in the Bluegrass region of Kentucky and adjacent regions of Ohio and West Virginia. A notable example was found by archaeologist William S. Webb during the excavations of the Mount Horeb Site 1 in Fayette County, Kentucky in 1939. Webb discovered a circle of "paired-posts" inside of the embankment ring and ditch. The 48.5 feet (14.8 m) circle was made up of sixty two "paired" post sets and eight single posts.

=== Hopewell timber circles ===
Other examples have been found at Hopewell culture sites in Ohio. Moorehead Circle was constructed about two millennia ago at the Fort Ancient Earthworks. It was discovered in 2005 by Jarrod Burks during magnetic surveys at the large hilltop enclosure near Lebanon, Ohio. The site consists of three concentric circles; with the outer circle being about 60 metres (200 ft) in diameter. Robert Riordan, Professor of Archaeology at Wright State University and lead archaeologist investigating the site, estimates that about two hundred wooden 10 feet (3.0 m) to 15 feet (4.6 m) tall posts were set in the outer circle. According to radiocarbon dates performed on charcoal found at the site, it was built between 40 BCE and 130 CE, with other charcoal fragments from burnt posts dating to 250 to 420 CE, suggesting the circle was in use for several centuries.

In September 2005 archaeologist Frank Cowan conducted excavations at the smaller circular enclosure at the Stubbs Earthworks in Warren County, Ohio; discovering a timber circle 240 feet (73 m) in diameter and composed of 172 large posts. Carbon dating of charcoal found in post molds at the site have dated the structure to 200-300 CE.

=== Cahokia ===
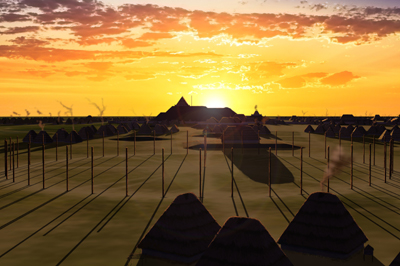
Artist's conception of Woodhenge III, Cahokia, at sunrise circa 1000 CE

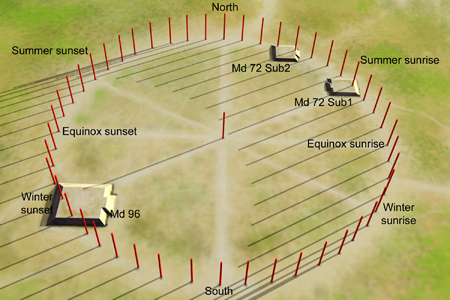
Solstice and equinox markers at the Md 72 woodhenge, Cahokia, with the hypothesized full circle of posts

The existence of the series of woodhenges at Cahokia was discovered during salvage archaeology undertaken by Dr. Warren Wittry in the early 1960s in preparation for a proposed highway interchange. Although the majority of the site contained village house features, a number of unusually shaped large post holes were also discovered. They formed a series of arcs of evenly spaced posts. Wittry hypothesized that the arcs could be whole circles and that the site was possibly a calendar for tracking solar events such as solstice and equinoxes. He began referring to the circles as "woodhenges"; comparing the structures to ones found in England. Additional excavations found evidence for five timber circles in the general vicinity, now designated Woodhenges I through V in Roman numerals. Each was a different diameter and had a different number of posts. Because four of the circles overlap each other it is thought they were built in a sequence, with each iteration generally being larger and containing 12 more posts than its predecessor. A full sequence for what has become known as Woodhenge III was found (except for nine posts on the western edge that had been lost to dump trucks for road construction fill) and a reconstruction of the circle was built in 1985; with the posts being placed into the original excavated post positions. The Illinois State Park system oversees the Cahokia site and hosts public sunrise observations at the vernal and autumnal equinoxes and the winter and summer solstices. Out of respect for Native American beliefs these events do not feature ceremonies or rituals of any kind.

Archaeologist Marvin Fowler has speculated that the woodhenges also served as “aligners” and that there may have been as many as 3 more in other strategic locations around the city of Cahokia, built to triangulate and lay out construction projects. At least one other possible circle at Cahokia has been put forward by Fowler, but his suggestion has not yet gained full acceptance by other archaeologists. This location was discovered near Mounds 72 and 96, directly to the south of Monks Mound. Several post holes of what may have been a ceremonial area with a 412 feet (126 m) in diameter circle and 48 posts. Archaeologists have dated the placement of at least one of the posts to approximately 950 CE. Archaeological research has shown that four of the posts were at the cardinal locations of north, south, east and west, with eastern and western posts marking the position of the equinox sunrise and sunsets. Four other posts in the circle were shown to be at the summer solstice sunrise and sunset and the winter solstice sunrise and sunset positions. This setup is nearly identical to the diameter and post positions of Woodhenge III, differing only in that Woodhenge III was 2 feet (0.61 m) smaller in diameter. The placement of the two mounds at the location and the directions in which they are oriented correspond to several of the solstice marking posts. The post nearest the later elite burial of the "Birdman" is the location that marked the summer solstice sunrise at the times of the sites use. The early stages of the mounds were actually constructed around the posts, although at a later point the posts were removed.
