= Short Woods Park Mound =

- U.S. National Register of Historic Places
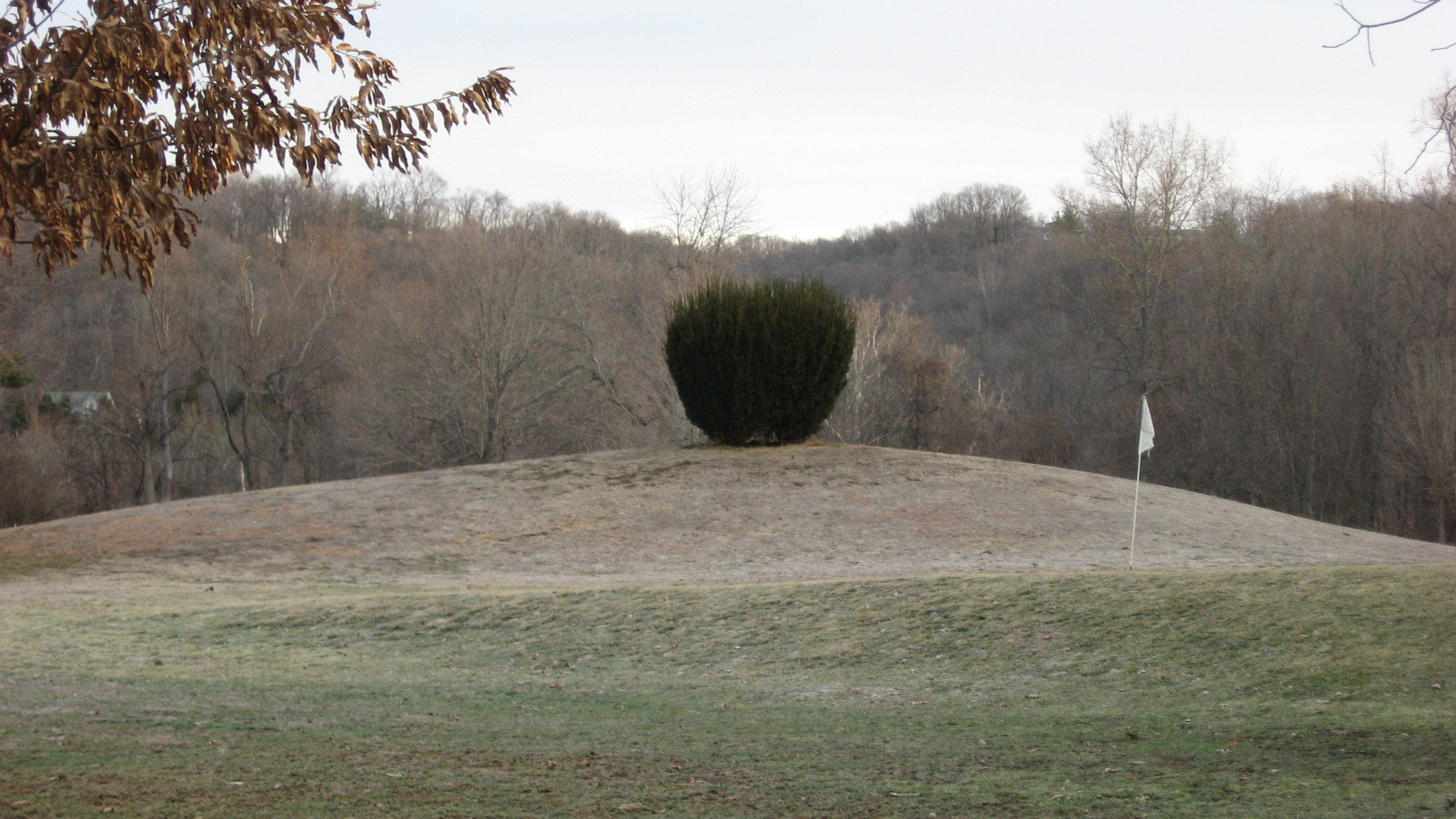
- Southwestern side of the mound

- Location within Ohio Location within the United States
- Location: Northern side of Sayler Park
- Nearest city: Cincinnati, Ohio
- Coordinates: 39°7′16.8″N 84°41′42″W
- Area: 5 acres (2.0 ha)
- NRHP reference No.: 74001521
- Added to NRHP: October 1, 1974

The Short Woods Park Mound is a Native American mound in the southwestern part of the U.S. state of Ohio. Located in the Sayler Park neighborhood of the city of Cincinnati, it is believed to have been built by people of the Adena culture. Measuring 38 feet (12 m) high, the mound is an ellipse, approximately 175 feet (53 m) long and 140 feet (43 m) wide.

The mound has been excavated by the Cincinnati Museum of Natural History and Science; among the many artifacts recovered were various grave goods and thirty-nine skeletons that were buried in log tombs. According to radiocarbon dating, the individuals buried in the mound lived approximately 2,000 years BP.

Although many Native American mounds were once located above the Ohio River in the vicinity of Sayler Park, most have been destroyed by development. Another mound, known as the Story Mound, lies along Gracely Drive in Sayler Park; other than the Story and Short Woods Park Mounds, virtually no mounds remain in the vicinity. Because of its proven value as an archaeological site, the Short Woods Park Mound was listed on the National Register of Historic Places in 1974; the Story Mound was accorded a similar status the following year.
