= Great Mound =

Great Mound may refer to:

- Great Mound (Anderson, Indiana), at Mounds State Park, listed on the NRHP in Indiana
- Great Mound (Marietta, Ohio), at Mound Cemetery, a.k.a. "Conus" or "Mound Cemetery Mound" (NRHP site #73001549), listed on the NRHP in Washington County, Ohio
- Great Mound (Middletown, Ohio), listed on the NRHP in Ohio
