= Shrum Mound =

Native American burial mound in Columbus, Ohio

- U.S. National Register of Historic Places
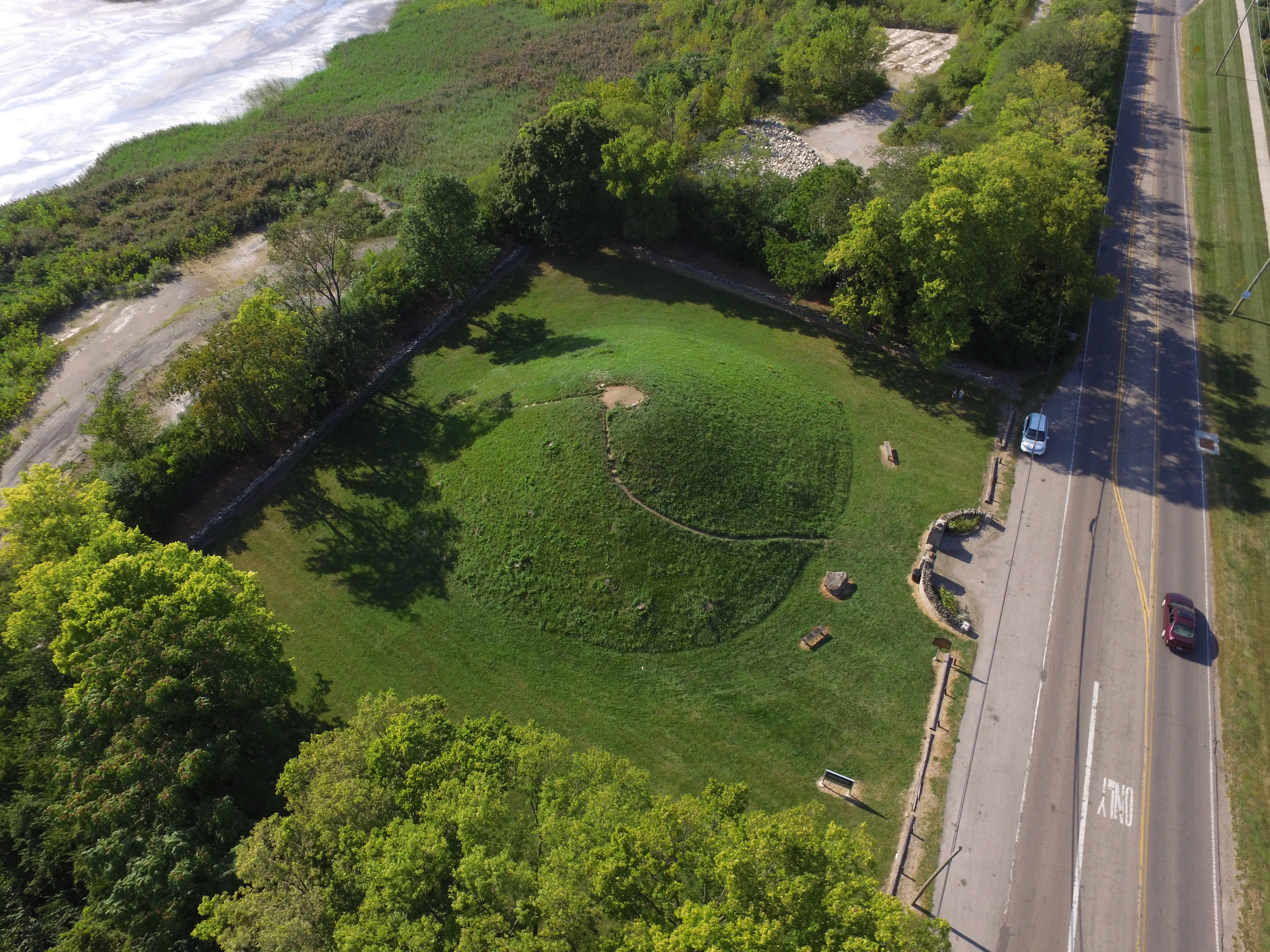
- Aerial view of Shrum Mound
- Location: 3141 McKinley Ave., Columbus, Ohio
- Coordinates: 39.990013°N 83.080567°W
- Area: 1 acre (0.40 ha)
- Built: c. 800 BC – AD 100
- Website: www.ohiohistory.org/visit/browse-historical-sites/shrum-mound/
- NRHP reference No.: 70000490
- Added to NRHP: November 10, 1970

Shrum Mound is a Native American conical burial mound in Campbell Memorial Park in Columbus, Ohio, built by people of the Adena culture roughly 2,000 years ago. It is one of the last surviving ancient mounds within the city of Columbus. The mound was entered on the National Register of Historic Places on November 10, 1970, under the official listing name "Campbell Mound."

== Description ==
Shrum Mound stands on a high bluff on the west side of the Scioto River, measuring approximately 20 feet (6 m) in height and about 100 feet (30 m) in diameter. The mound is bordered by an active quarry lake known locally as the McKinley Avenue Quarry, operated by the Columbus Division of Water; limestone was extracted there from the late 19th century into the early 20th century, after which the exhausted quarry filled with water. Beginning in the 1970s the city used the flooded quarry as a repository for residual byproducts of municipal water treatment; as of 2026 the city has undertaken a large dredging project there, citing the site's limited remaining capacity.

Access to the summit has changed over time. Ohio History Connection's own photograph archive, spanning 1929 to 1963, describes a set of formal steps leading to the top. More recent visitor accounts instead describe two unpaved dirt paths to the summit — a gentler route from the park's entry gate and a steeper, more direct route on the western side.

The mound has never been archaeologically excavated, and its precise contents remain unknown.

== Cultural context ==
The Adena were among Ohio's earliest known settled cultures, living primarily as hunter-gatherers, traders, and farmers in the upper and middle Ohio Valley during the late Archaic and Early Woodland periods. They carved effigy figures, made ceramic pottery, built substantial houses, and constructed burial mounds of earth, stone, human remains, and grave goods on uplands near major waterways — a pattern consistent with Shrum Mound's position above the Scioto. Sources vary somewhat on the precise dating of the culture: Ohio History Connection's own visitor materials and the on-site historical markers place it at roughly 800 BC to AD 100, while Ohio History Connection's separate Ohio Memory photograph archive and the Ancient Ohio Trail project instead give a range of roughly 500 BC to AD 200. Both ranges fall within the standard scholarly window for the Adena.

== History ==
The mound is named for its donors, the Shrum family, on whose farmland it once stood. Minnie R. Shrum, an educator, deeded the site to the Ohio Historical Society (now the Ohio History Connection) in 1928. This attribution is corroborated independently by Ohio History Connection's own visitor materials, its Ohio Memory photograph archive, and both on-site historical markers. An earlier published account instead credited the donation to Governor James E. Campbell rather than the Shrum family; (Note: Russell Long, "OHIO," The Archaeological Society of Ohio (Winter 1984), p. 22, as cited in the earlier version of this article. This account was not independently accessible for verification during this revision; it is noted here for completeness, but the Shrum-family attribution is used in the body text given the number and independence of the sources supporting it, several of which are Ohio History Connection's own materials.) that claim is not adopted here.

The surrounding park, Campbell Memorial Park, is named for James E. Campbell, Governor of Ohio from 1890 to 1892, who later served as president of the Ohio Archaeological and Historical Society (the predecessor of the Ohio Historical Society) from 1913 to 1924. His daughter, Jessie Campbell Coons, named the park in his memory in 1929. The Ohio Archaeological and Historical Society erected an on-site memorial marker the same year.

The property was added to the National Register of Historic Places on November 10, 1970, listed under the name "Campbell Mound." Its National Register entry cites information potential as the applicable significance criterion and lists prehistory as its area of significance, with an estimated period of significance spanning roughly 499 BC to AD 499.

In the summer of 2015, the Ohio History Connection removed approximately 18 trees that had grown on top of the mound, citing concerns that a strong storm could topple a tree and damage the burial site.

In January 2026, the Ohio History Connection publicly asked visitors to stop using the mound as a sledding hill, emphasizing its status as a burial site. OHC archaeologist Neil Thompson stated that the mound likely still contains numerous interments and described it as sacred ground for that reason.

== Visiting ==
Shrum Mound is located at 3141 McKinley Avenue, about half a mile south of Trabue Road, in Columbus's West Scioto neighborhood. The site is managed by the Ohio History Connection and is open to visitors free of charge, with a typical visit lasting about 30 minutes.

== See also ==
- List of Adena culture sites
- Conus Mound (see Marietta Earthworks)
- National Register of Historic Places listings in Franklin County, Ohio
