= Adena Mansion =

Historic house and museum in Chillicothe, Ohio

- Adena
- U.S. National Register of Historic Places
- U.S. National Historic Landmark District
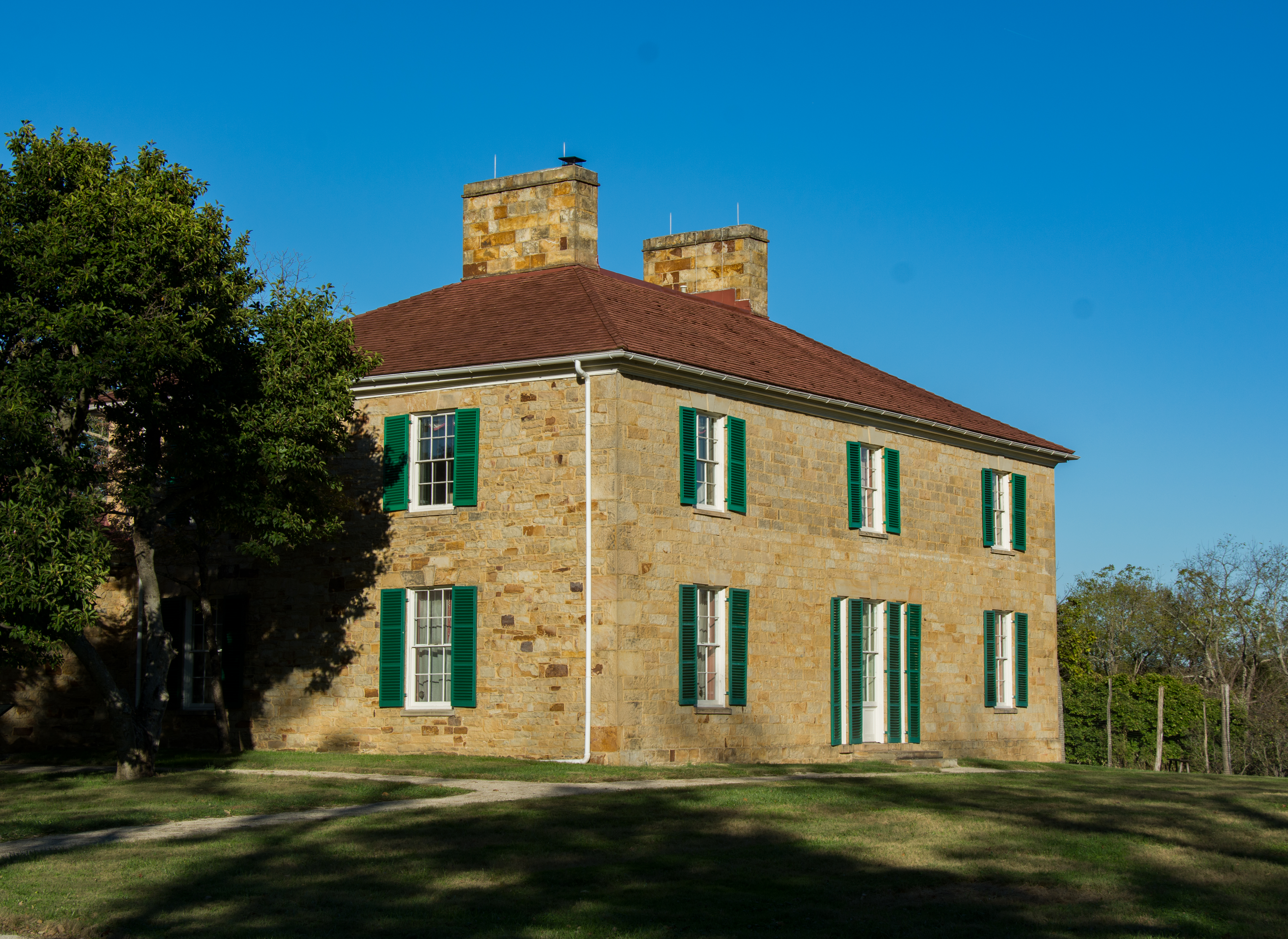
- Southern elevation

- Location within Ohio Location within the United States
- Nearest city: Chillicothe, Ohio
- Coordinates: 39°21′18″N 83°0′49″W
- Area: 300 acres (120 ha)
- Built: 1806
- Architect: Benjamin H. Latrobe
- Architectural style: Early Federal
- NRHP reference No.: 70000515
- Added to NRHP: November 10, 1970

The Adena Mansion is a historic house museum in Chillicothe, Ohio. It was built for Thomas Worthington by Benjamin Latrobe, and was completed in 1807. The house is located on a hilltop west of downtown Chillicothe. The property surrounding the mansion included the location of the first mound found to belong to the Adena culture and thus the Adena mansion is the namesake for the Adena people. The state coat of arms depicts the view of Mount Logan from the Adena property. The Adena Mansion is owned and operated by the Ohio History Connection and is open seasonally to visitors for a small fee.

== History ==
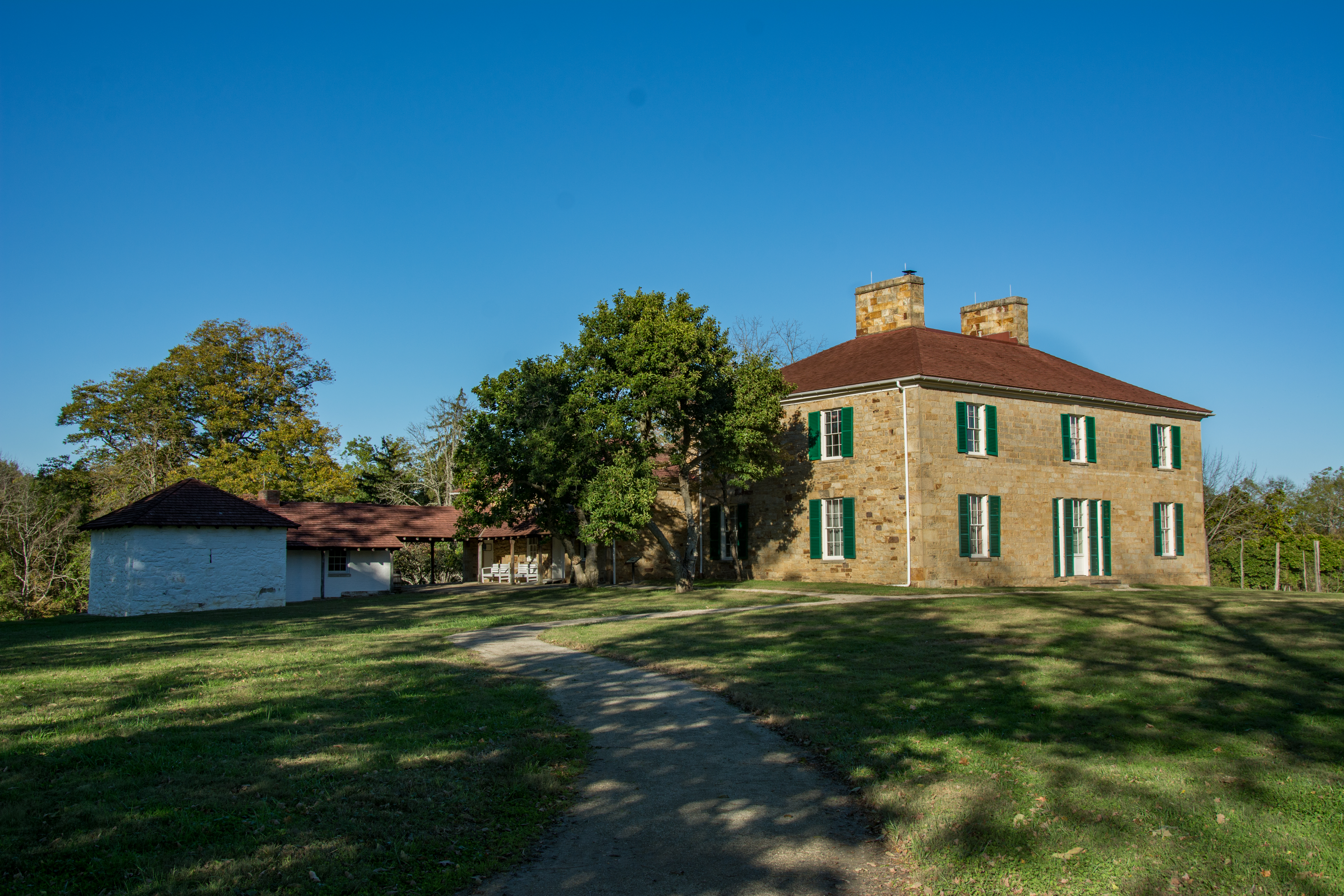
Mansion and outbuildings

The stone mansion has historically accurate interiors, including furnishings. The grounds cover 300 acres (1.2 km^{2}) of the original 2,000-acre (8.1 km^{2}) estate. There is a garden area featuring kitchen herbs and heirloom vegetables, with some varieties available for purchase. A former overseer's house has also been restored and demonstrates life for German immigrants to the area.

A modern museum and education center features exhibits on the early European settlement of Ohio. Documents for indentured servants, other primary source materials and archeological finds are showcased.

Thomas Worthington recorded that he chose Adena as the name for his estate because it referred to "places remarkable for the delightfulness of their situation." The museum at Adena has an exhibit which claims Adena is based on a Hebrew word.

In 1996, Ohio Revised Code Section 5.04 stated that the official coat of arms of Ohio depicted a view of Mount Logan from the mansion.

In 2003, the Adena Mansion was restored to its 19th century appearance to celebrate the Ohio Bicentennial. The estate was designated as a National Historic Landmark on February 28, 2003, primarily because it is one of the few surviving examples of Latrobe's designs.

The village of Adena in Jefferson County is named after the Adena Mansion.

== See also ==
- List of National Historic Landmarks in Ohio
