= Arledge =

Arledge may refer to:

- Arledge Field, a public airport in Stamford, Texas
- Arledge Mounds I and II, a pair of registered historic structures near Circleville, Ohio
- Arledge Armenaki (born 1949), American cinematographer
- John Arledge (1906–1947), American actor
- Roone Arledge (1931–2002), American sports broadcaster
