= Story Mound =

Story Mound may refer to:

- Story Mound (Cincinnati, Ohio), listed on the NRHP in Cincinnati, Ohio
- Story Mound State Memorial, listed on the NRHP in Ross County, Ohio
