= Mount Horeb Earthworks Complex =

Archaeological site in Kentucky, US

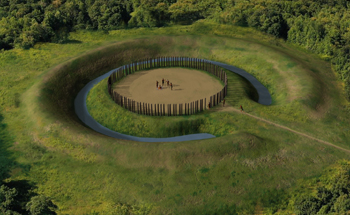
- Artists conception of Mount Horeb Site 1

- Location within Kentucky today
- 38°9′32″N 84°27′56″W
- Cultures: Adena culture
- Location: Lexington, Kentucky, Fayette County, Kentucky, US
- Region: Fayette County, Kentucky

Site notes
- Architectural styles: Earthworks, causewayed ring ditch, timber circle
- Excavation dates: 1939
- Archaeologists: William S. Webb

The Mount Horeb Earthworks Complex is an Adena culture group of earthworks in Lexington, Kentucky. It consists of two major components, the Mount Horeb Site 1 and the Peter Village enclosure, and several smaller features including the Grimes Village site, Tarleton Mound, and Fisher Mound. The Peter Village and Grimes Village enclosures were mapped by Rafinesque and featured in Squier and Davis's landmark publication Ancient Monuments of the Mississippi Valley in 1848 as Plate XIV Figures 3 and 4.

== Mount Horeb Site 1 ==
This site is the center piece of the University of Kentucky's Adena Park and is located on a bank 75 feet (23 m) above Elkhorn Creek. It features a causewayed ring ditch with a circular 105-foot (32 m) diameter platform, surrounded by a 45-foot (14 m) wide ditch and a 13-foot (4.0 m) wide enclosure with a 33-foot (10 m) wide entryway facing to the west. In 1939 the site was excavated by William S. Webb and the Works Projects Administration. They discovered the postholes of a circular wooden structure on the platform, which Webb speculated was a ceremonial center for a nearby clan. The 48.5 feet (14.8 m) timber circle was made up of 132 posts, 62 "paired" posts and 8 single posts. In 1936 the site and 6 acres (2.4 hectares) were paid for through private donations and transferred to the Kentucky Archaeological Society. It is currently owned and operated by the University of Kentucky as part of the Campus Recreation Department.

== Peter Village enclosure ==
The earliest occupation at this site is 300 to 200 BCE and is considered to be a pre-Adena site for harvesting and processing galena, which occurs naturally nearby. At this time the site had an earthen enclosure and a palisade and later a 2-meter (6.6 ft) deep ditch. Rafinesque described the site as a twenty sided icosogonal polygon 3,767 feet (1,148 m) long with a 15 feet (4.6 m) wide 4 feet (1.2 m) to 8 feet (2.4 m) deep ditch surrounding it. An entryway to the enclosure was located to the south.

== Images in Squier and Davis ==
Mount Horeb, described as "ancient work near Lexington, Kentucky," was featured in the 1848 book Ancient Monuments of the Mississippi Valley by Ephraim George Squier and Edwin Hamilton Davis.

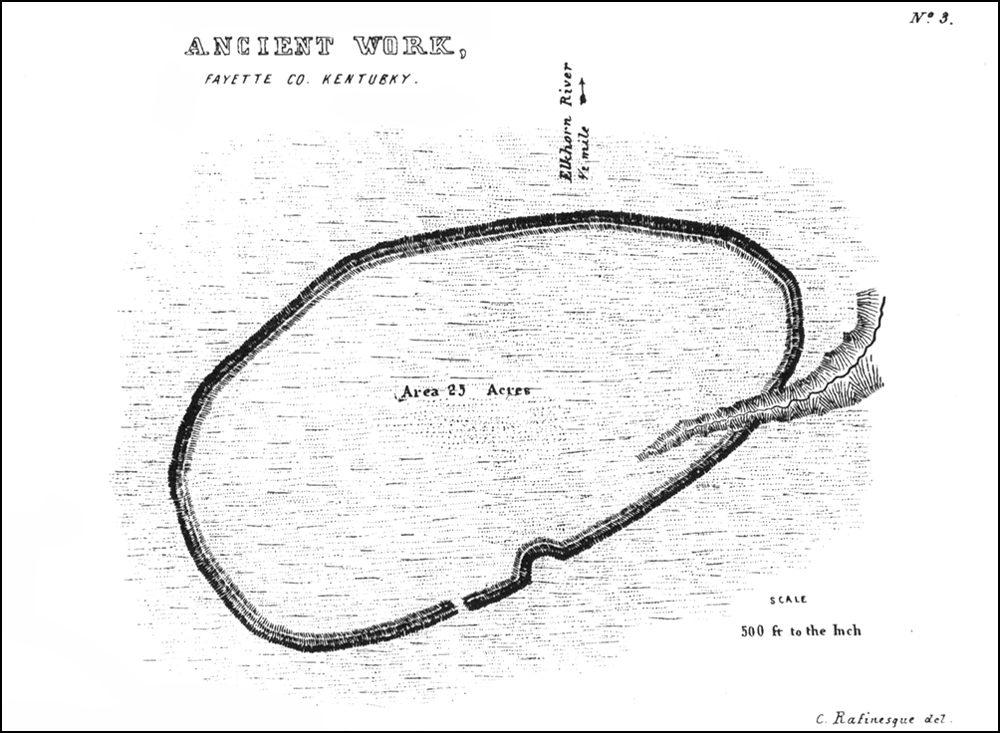
Peter Village enclosure

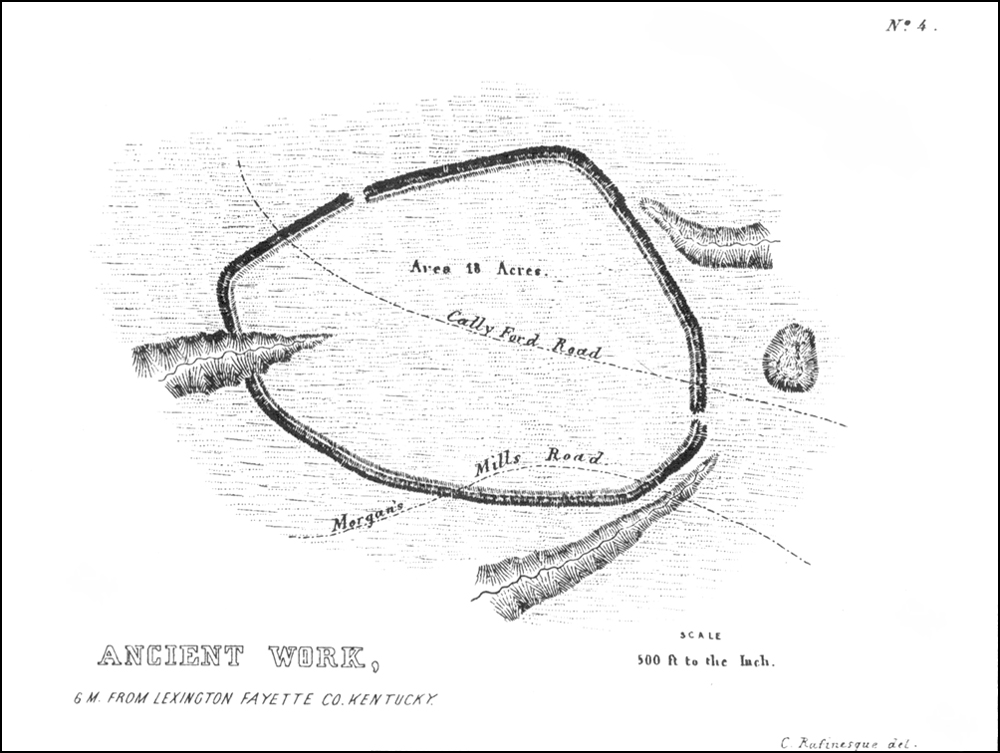
Grimes Village enclosure

== See also ==
- Portsmouth Earthworks
