= Snead Mound =

Archaeological site in Ohio, United States

- U.S. National Register of Historic Places
- Location: Off U.S. Route 52
- Nearest city: Neville, Ohio
- Area: 1 acre (0.40 ha)
- NRHP reference No.: 74001418
- Added to NRHP: July 30, 1974

The Snead Mound is a Native American mound in the southwestern portion of the U.S. state of Ohio. Located off U.S. Route 52 near the community of Neville, it lies in woodland atop a bluff. The mound is a conical structure measures approximately 5 feet (1.5 m) high and 55 feet (17 m) in diameter at the base; except for a small hole that may have been dug by a hunter, the mound appears never to have been disturbed since white settlement of the region.

Due to its location on a bluff and its distance from all known prehistoric settlements, the Snead Mound is believed to be the work of the Adena culture. This identification is not conclusive, for the mound has never been excavated. Nevertheless, as an almost-undisturbed burial mound constructed by an ancient mound-building culture, the Snead Mound is a significant archaeological site. Because it has never been excavated, it doubtless still contains the remains of the individual or individuals buried by its builders. In recognition of its archaeological value, it was listed on the National Register of Historic Places in 1974.
