= Ring ditch =

In archaeology, a ring ditch is a trench of circular or penannular plan, cut into bedrock. They are usually identified through aerial photography either as soil marks or cropmarks. When excavated, ring ditches are usually found to be the ploughed‐out remains of a round barrow where the barrow mound has completely disappeared, leaving only the infilled former quarry ditch. Both Neolithic and Bronze Age ring ditches have been discovered.

The term is most often used as a generic description in cases where there is no clear evidence for the function of the site: for instance where it has been ploughed flat and is known only as a cropmark or a geophysical anomaly. The two most frequent monument types represented by ring ditches are roundhouses (where the 'ditch' is actually a foundation slot or eaves drip gully) and round barrows. The term is not normally used for larger features than these. Larger features would instead be described as 'circular enclosures'.

Also related to ring ditches, is the causewayed ring ditch, which is a roughly circular ditch with a central area and multiple causeways which cross it. The causewayed ring ditch is a subcategory of the ring ditch.

== Context ==
O. G. S. Crawford was the first to contemplate the secrets of these crop and contour marks in the ordnance survey. This resulted in the exploration of a double ring ditch in 1931, although most ring ditches are true circles with only one ditch. However, ditches have been known to overlap and, in two cases, three concentric circles have been discovered.

=== Occupation ===
Ring ditches are a form of earthwork that are associated with human occupation of a place. These height and width of these earthworks vary depending on where they're located and the culture that was responsible for their creation.

== Pre-Columbian ring ditches ==
Found in eastern Bolivia, the pre-Columbian ring ditches have often been interpreted as evidence of cultural development and population movement in Amazonian archaeology. Ring ditches in this area were found near raised fields, unlike their counterparts in the East, where they were first described.

=== Measurement and records ===
There are multiple ways to measure and record ring ditches. One such project, centered on Santa Ana del Yacuma (near the Yacuma River) used the following methods to measure and record ring ditches:

First, ASTER, Advanced Spaceborne Thermal Emission and Reflection Radiometer, was used in combination with GPS data to help guide field survey. Second, these earthworks were individually mapped using GPS. Third, visible ceramics on the surface of these earthworks were collected. Finally, the collected ceramics were described using a modal analysis.

== Caucasian ring ditches ==
The analysis of CORONA satellite images, as well as satellite and aerial photos of the 1970s and 1980s, revealed more than thirty ring-shaped structures. Most of these structures are located between Stavropol and Pyatigorsk in northwestern Caucasus. The sites resemble circular ditches around a large central place without any sign of an entrance. The structures resemble the size and shape those of the well known Neolithic ring-ditches from Slovakia, Austria, Southern Bavaria and England.

== Walton Court ring ditch ==
An excavation team determined the nature of the ring ditch located in Radnorshire's Walton Basin, near Walton Court Farm in September 2009. It was identified as a crop mark via aerial photography. The measurements of the ring ditch include a 100m diameter and a somewhat narrow ditch.

This ring ditch is the largest site in mid and northeast Wales to date. The sections excavated allowed dating of the ring ditch but did not reveal any artifacts or archaeological evidence, with the exception of charcoal recovered from the base which was dated at 2570-2300 cal. BC.
