= David Stitt Mound =

Archaeological site in Ohio, United States

- U.S. National Register of Historic Places
- Location within Ohio Location within the United States
- Nearest city: Chillicothe, Ohio
- Area: 0.5 acres (0.20 ha)
- NRHP reference No.: 72001040
- Added to NRHP: November 9, 1972

The David Stitt Mound is a Native American mound near Chillicothe in Ross County, Ohio, United States. Located on elevated land at a significant distance from the Scioto River, the mound is built in a sub-conical shape; it is 19.4 feet (5.9 m) high and has a diameter of approximately 130 feet (40 m).

At some point since white settlement of southern Ohio, the Stitt Mound was excavated by the creation of a tunnel to its center. While any records produced by the excavators have been lost, it is believed that the excavation was supervised by Ohio Archaeological and Historical Society archaeologist Clarence Loveberry, who undertook multiple such excavations in Ross County in the late 1890s.

Although no artifacts from the Stitt Mound are extant, its shape and location indicate that it is likely a work of the Adena culture, whose mounds were characteristically built for religious or ceremonial purposes. Because the Adena typically built mounds around log charnel houses, it is possible that bones and evidence of wooden structures are still extant within the mound; consequently, the mound is a potential archaeological site. In recognition of its archaeological value, the David Stitt Mound was listed on the National Register of Historic Places in 1972.
