= Horn Mound =

Archaeological site in Ohio, United States

- U.S. National Register of Historic Places
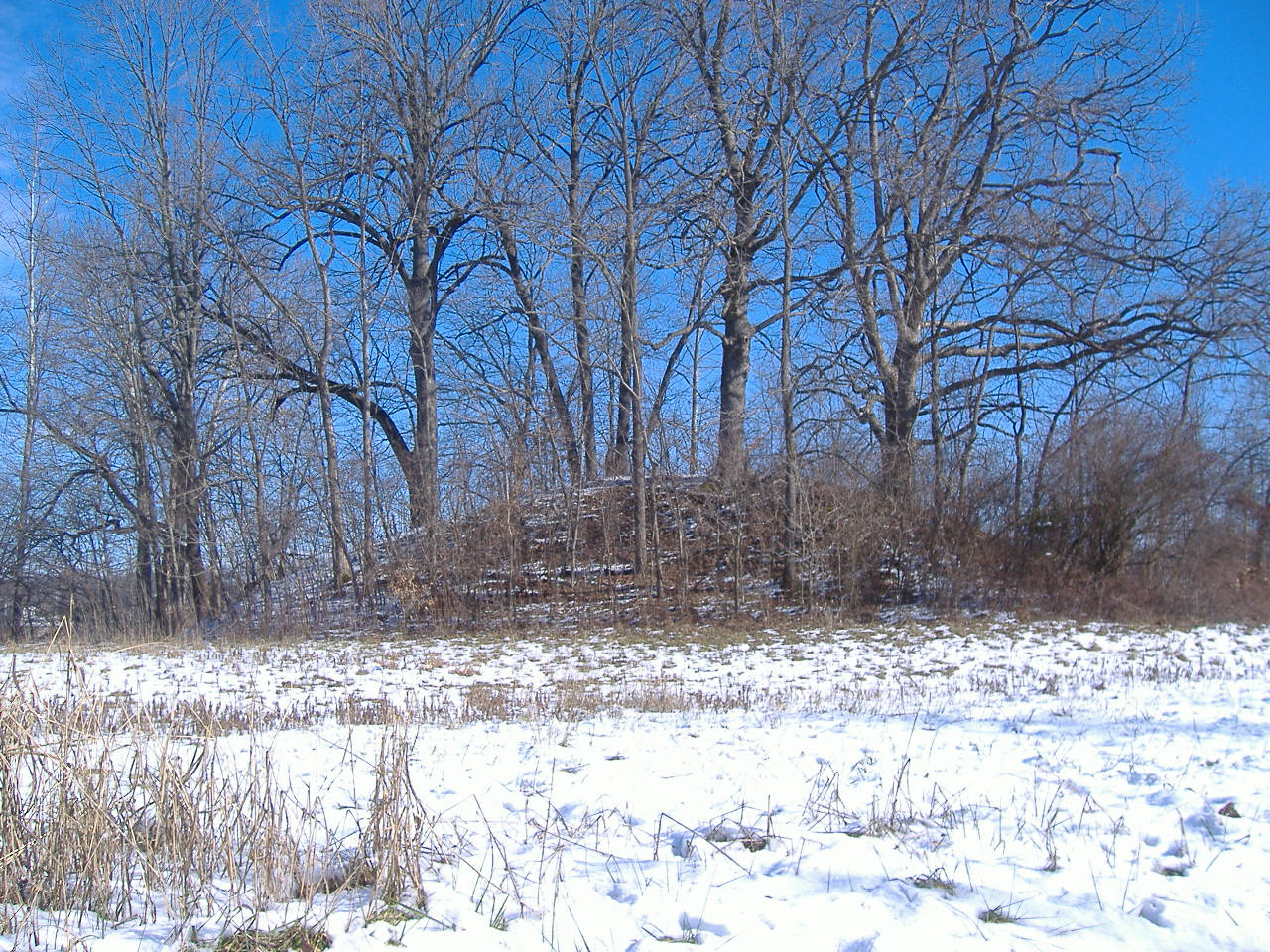
- View from the dead end of Armstrong Road

- Location within Ohio Location within the United States
- Location: Junction of Armstrong and Moccasin Rds., southeast of Tarlton
- Coordinates: 39°31′20″N 82°44′22″W
- Area: 1 acre (0.40 ha)
- NRHP reference No.: 74001595
- Added to NRHP: August 7, 1974

The Horn Mound is a Native American mound in eastern Pickaway County, Ohio, United States. Located near the village of Tarlton, the mound sits along a stream at a significant distance from any other prehistoric sites. It is believed to have been built by people of the Adena culture, who constructed many burial mounds and other ceremonial earthworks in prehistoric Ohio. Although erosion by the nearby stream has the potential of damaging the mound, it appears to be virtually undisturbed by human exploration. Because of its pristine state, the Horn Mound is a likely archaeological site, and for this reason it was listed on the National Register of Historic Places in 1974.
