= Conrad Mound Archeological Site =

Archaeological site in Ohio, United States

- U.S. National Register of Historic Places
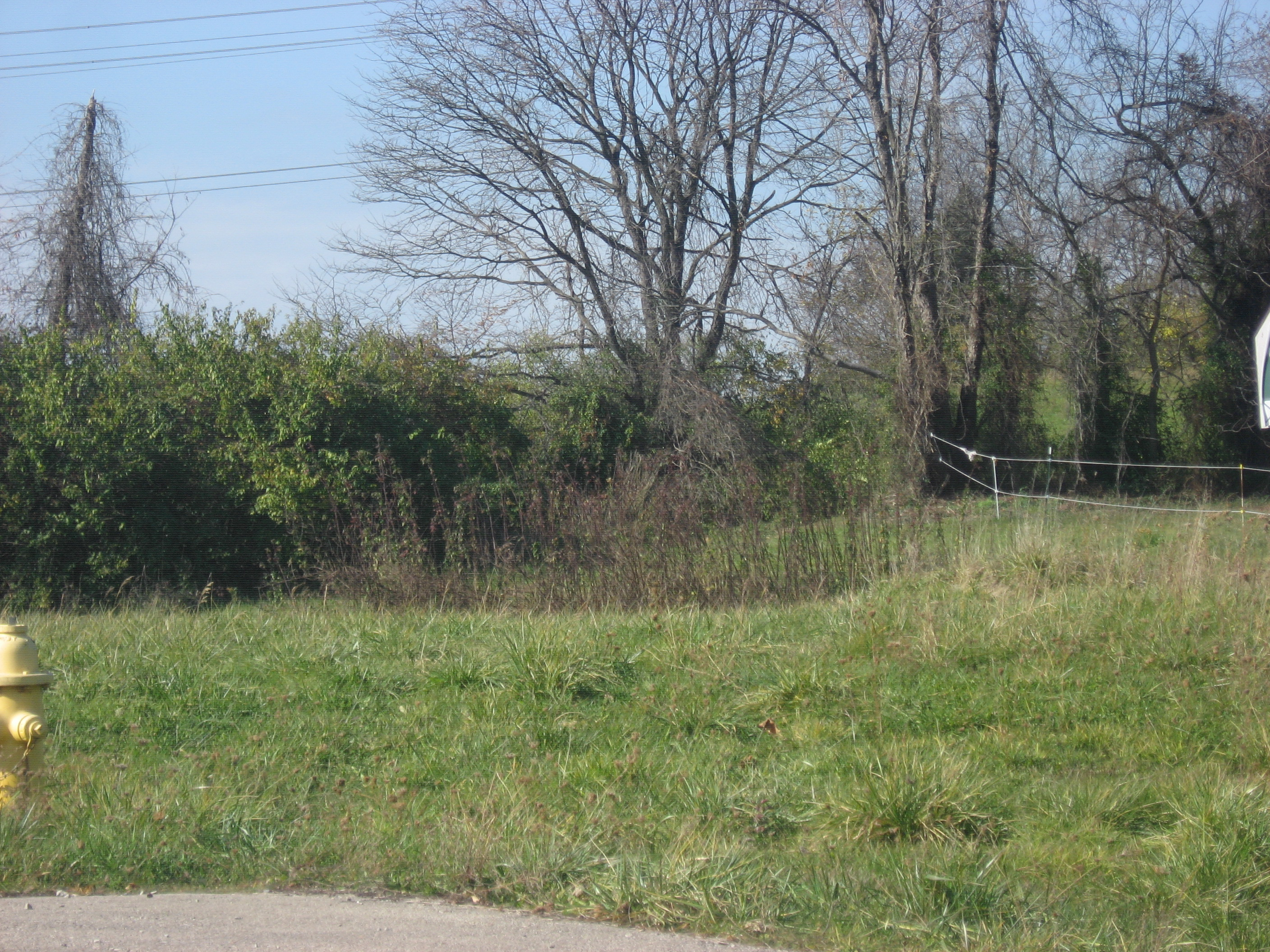
- View from the east

- Location within Ohio Location within the United States
- Location: West of Rittenhouse Road
- Nearest city: Cleves, Ohio
- Coordinates: 39°8′49″N 84°46′20″W
- Area: 5 acres (2.0 ha)
- NRHP reference No.: 75001420
- Added to NRHP: June 20, 1975

The Conrad Mound Archeological Site is an archaeological site in the southwestern part of the U.S. state of Ohio. Located east of Cleves in Hamilton County, the site is centered on an isolated Native American mound. Its location atop a ridgeline has been interpreted as evidence that the mound was constructed by the Adena culture. No artifacts have been found at the site, for no archaeological excavation has ever been carried out; however, experience with other sites has led archaeologists to surmise that the mound is surrounded by a larger zone of archaeological interest. Because of its potential archaeological value, the mound was listed on the National Register of Historic Places in 1975.
