= Kinzer Mound =

Archaeological site in Ohio, United States

- U.S. National Register of Historic Places
- Nearest city: South Salem, Ohio
- Area: 1 acre (0.40 ha)
- NRHP reference No.: 74001617
- Added to NRHP: January 17, 1974

The Kinzer Mound is a Native American mound in Ross County, Ohio, United States. Located outside of the village of South Salem, the mound sits on high ground far from any stream. Built in a sub-conical shape; it is 7.6 feet (2.3 m) tall and has a diameter of approximately 70 feet (21 m).

Due to the mound's location and shape, it is believed to have been built by people of the Adena culture. If this is correct, the mound is likely to contain the remains of a wooden structure used for ceremonial purposes. As such, it is a potential archaeological site. In recognition of its prehistoric significance, the Kinzer Mound was listed on the National Register of Historic Places in 1974.
