= D.S. Rose Mound =

Archaeological site in Ohio, United States

- U.S. National Register of Historic Places
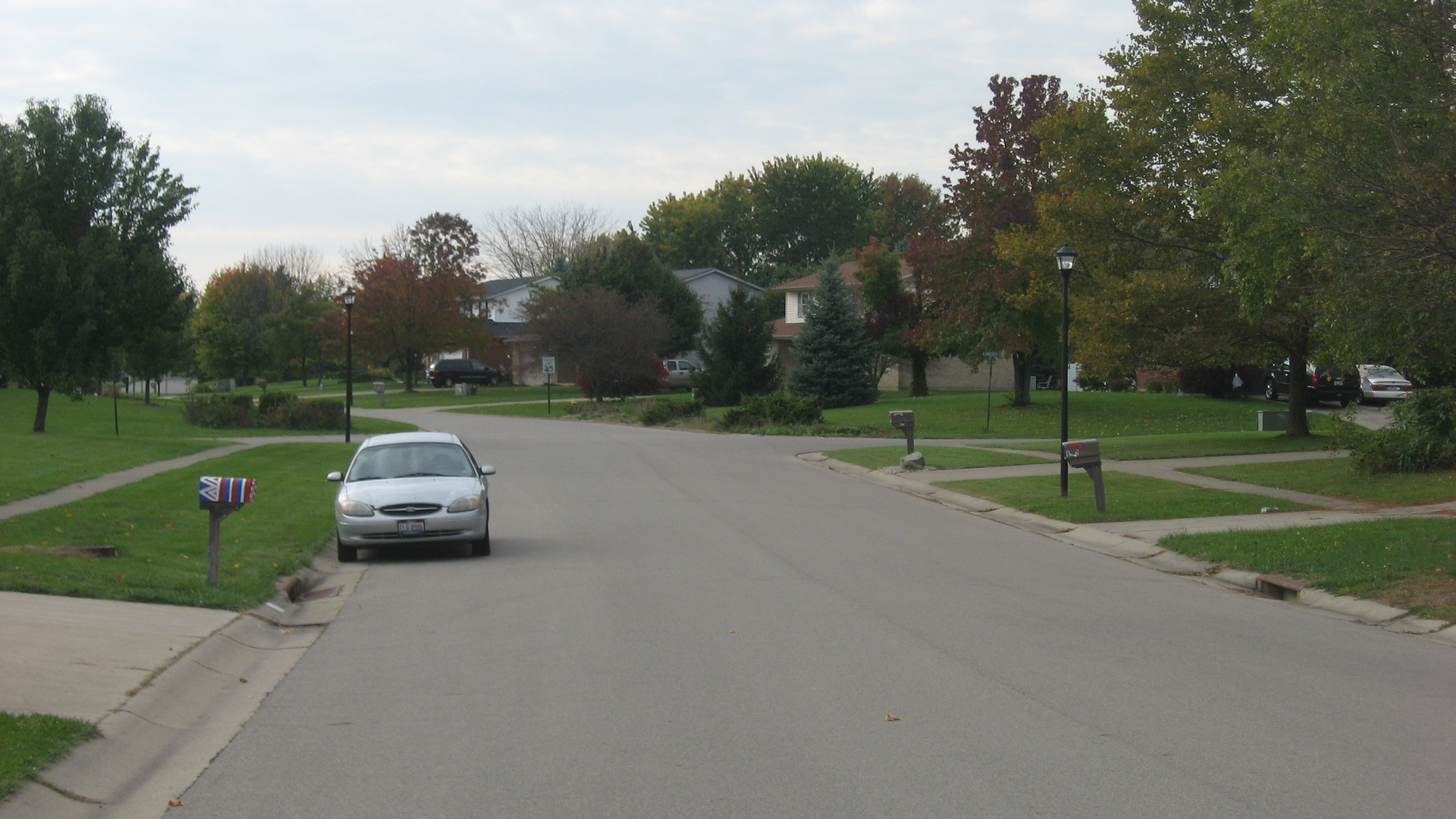
- Site of the mound
- Nearest city: Huntsville, Ohio
- Area: 11 acres (4.5 ha)
- NRHP reference No.: 75001333
- Added to NRHP: May 28, 1975

The D.S. Rose Mound was a Native American mound in the southwestern part of the U.S. state of Ohio. Located north of Huntsville in Butler County, the mound was also known as the "Holloway Mound." Its placement on a ridgeline above flat countryside has been interpreted as an indication that it was built by the Adena culture.

No excavation was ever conducted at the Rose Mound, either by archaeologists or by interested locals; consequently, it remained one of the best-preserved archaeological sites in southwestern Ohio throughout the twentieth century. Because of its archaeological value, it was listed on the National Register of Historic Places in 1975.

Despite the mound's great value for archaeological information, it was demolished by local land developers in the autumn of 1991. Protests from the Ohio Historical Society were ignored, and the mound and its contents were destroyed on October 8 or 9. While the mound is no longer in existence, it remains listed on the National Register.
