= Ross Trails Adena Circle =

Archaeological site in Ohio, United States

- U.S. National Register of Historic Places
- Nearest city: Ross, Ohio
- Area: 3 acres (1.2 ha)
- NRHP reference No.: 75001339
- Added to NRHP: October 10, 1975

The Ross Trails Adena Circle is an archaeological site in the southwestern part of the U.S. state of Ohio. Located northwest of Ross in Butler County, it appears to have been a sacred circle constructed by people of the Adena culture.

The circle is composed of an earthen wall, approximately 1 foot (0.30 m) high. Its interior, which is slightly raised above the surrounding terrain, can be accessed through a small opening in the wall that appears to have housed a gate at one time. Because the circle has never been excavated, its contents and uses are uncertain; however, archaeologists have speculated that postholes or other evidence of a house or similar structure may be contained within the circle.

In 1975, the circle's archaeological value was recognized when it was added to the National Register of Historic Places. The landmarked area includes approximately 3 acres (1.2 ha) of land, due to the possibility of finding related artifacts in the close vicinity of the circle.
