= Arledge Mounds I and II =

Archaeological site in Ohio, United States

- U.S. National Register of Historic Places
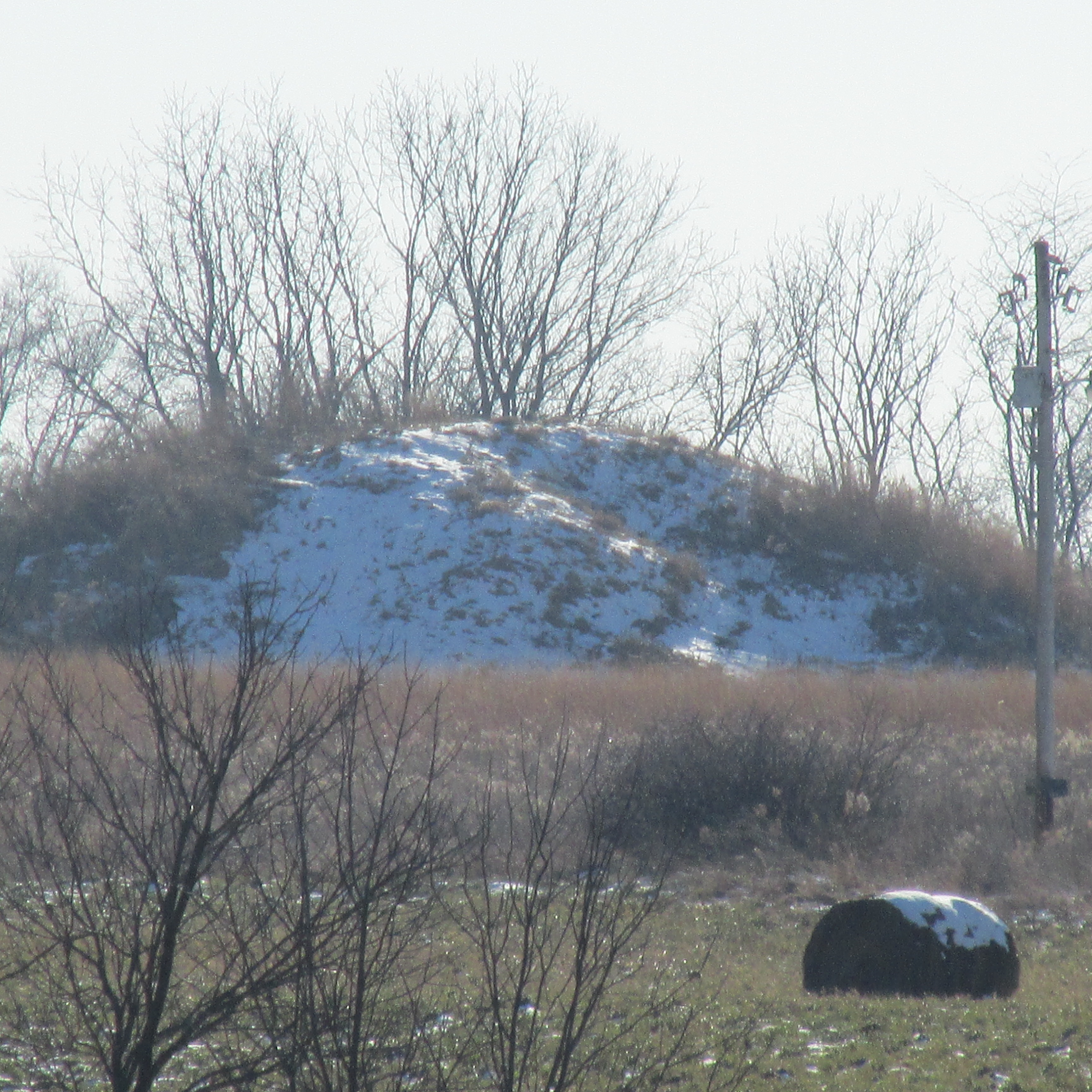
- The Arledge Mounds

- Location within Ohio Location within the United States
- Location: Off State Route 56 southeast of Circleville
- Coordinates: 39°33′0″N 82°52′27″W
- Area: 4 acres (1.6 ha)
- NRHP reference No.: 74001591
- Added to NRHP: July 30, 1974

The Arledge Mounds are a pair of Native American mounds in the south central part of the U.S. state of Ohio. Located near Circleville in Pickaway County, the two mounds lie in the middle of a farm field, far from any roads. These two mounds are disparate in size: while the smaller mound's height is 5 feet (1.5 m), the other's is 20 feet (6.1 m), and their diameters are approximately 65 feet (20 m) and 120 feet (37 m) respectively.

Most unusual is the proximity of the mounds to each other — while many groups of mounds are known in Ohio, they are not typically connected at the base as these two mounds are; only the Arledge Mounds and the McMurray Mounds, which straddled the border between Franklin and Madison counties, are known to have been conjoined. Although these mounds have not been excavated, archaeologists have proposed that they were built by the Adena culture, who are known to have built the McMurray Mounds.

As undisturbed works of the Adena or some other mound building culture, the Arledge Mounds are potentially a valuable archaeological site. In recognition of this fact, they were listed on the National Register of Historic Places in 1974.

== See also ==
- List of burial mounds in the United States
