= Story Mound (Cincinnati, Ohio) =

- U.S. National Register of Historic Places
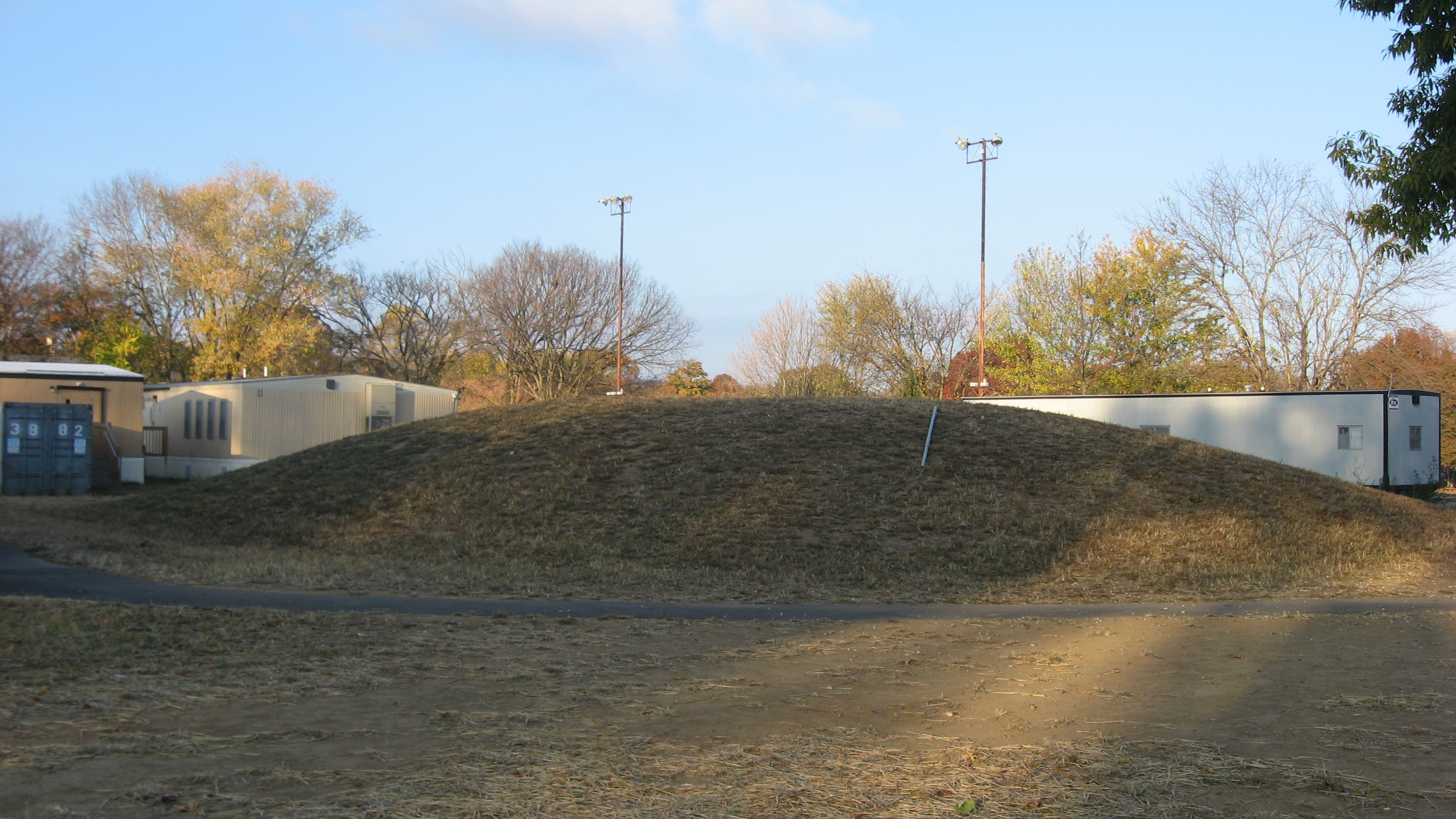
- Eastern side of the mound

- Location within Ohio Location within the United States
- Location: Gracely Drive in Sayler Park
- Nearest city: Cincinnati, Ohio
- Coordinates: 39°7′1″N 84°41′21.6″W
- Area: 0.5 acres (0.20 ha)
- NRHP reference No.: 75001436
- Added to NRHP: June 11, 1975

The Story Mound is a Native American mound in the southwestern part of the U.S. state of Ohio. Located in the Sayler Park neighborhood of the city of Cincinnati, the mound lies along Gracely Drive. No archaeological excavation has ever been conducted at the mound, and it has remained otherwise undisturbed as well; consequently, the mound remains in pristine condition. Despite the lack of evidence from excavations, the mound has been determined to be a work of the Adena culture, due in part to artifacts such as bones that have been found in the land immediately surrounding the mound. These findings, together with the mound's location near the floodplain of the Ohio River, have been understood as evidence of a larger group of Adena sites in the vicinity of the Story Mound. Such a complex, if it exists, would have great value as an archaeological site; therefore, the Story Mound was listed on the National Register of Historic Places in 1975.
