= Adena mound =

Archaeological type site

- Adena Mound
- U.S. National Register of Historic Places
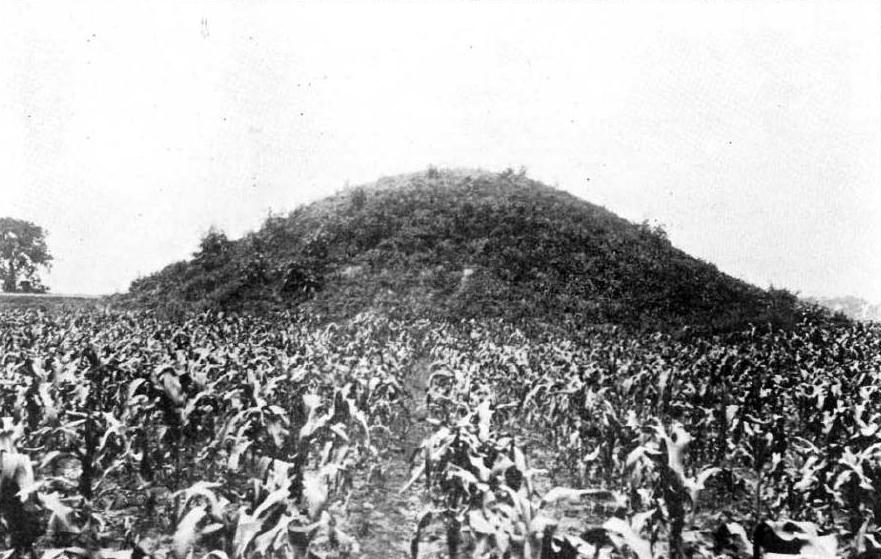
- Pre-1901 view of the mound

- Location within Ohio Location within the United States
- Location: Ross County, Ohio
- Nearest city: Chillicothe, Ohio
- Coordinates: 39°21′21.34″N 83°0′32.62″W
- Area: 1.4 acres (0.57 ha)
- NRHP reference No.: 75001529
- Added to NRHP: June 5, 1975

The Adena Mound is a Native American mound site on the grounds of the Adena Mansion, for which it is named, near Chillicothe, Ohio. The mound is the type site for the Adena culture of precontact mound builders. Carbon dating of artifacts from the mound places its construction between 100 B.C. and A.D. 40 William C. Mills, Ohio's state curator of archaeology, excavated the mound in 1901; before the excavation, it was 26 feet (7.9 m) tall. Artifacts found in the mound include the Adena Pipe, later designated Ohio's state artifact, as well as jewelry, projectile points, and textiles.

The site was listed in the National Register on June 5, 1975.

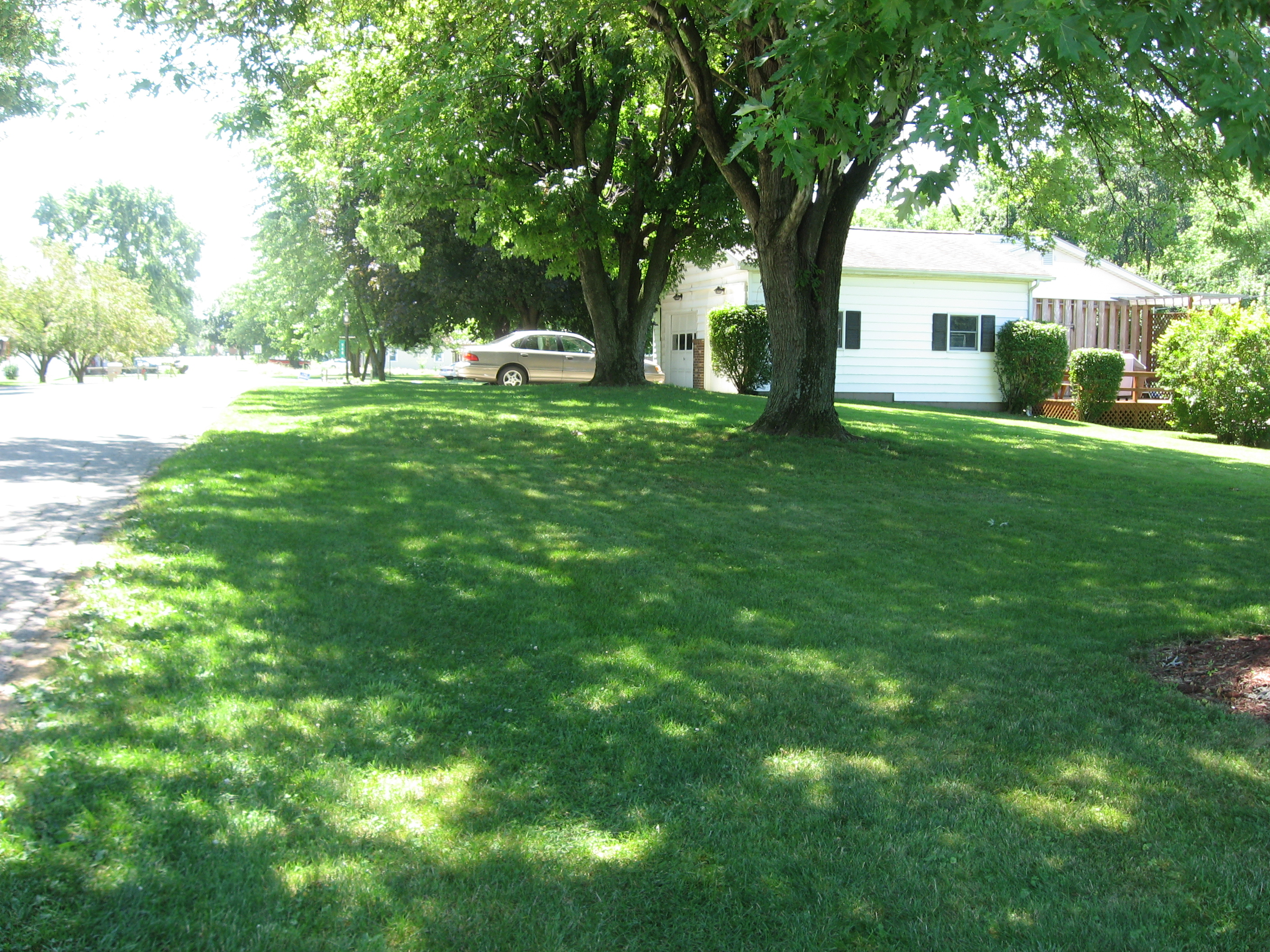
Present view of the base of the mound

== See also ==
- Adena culture
