= Great Mound (Middletown, Ohio) =

Archaeological site in Ohio, United States

- U.S. National Register of Historic Places
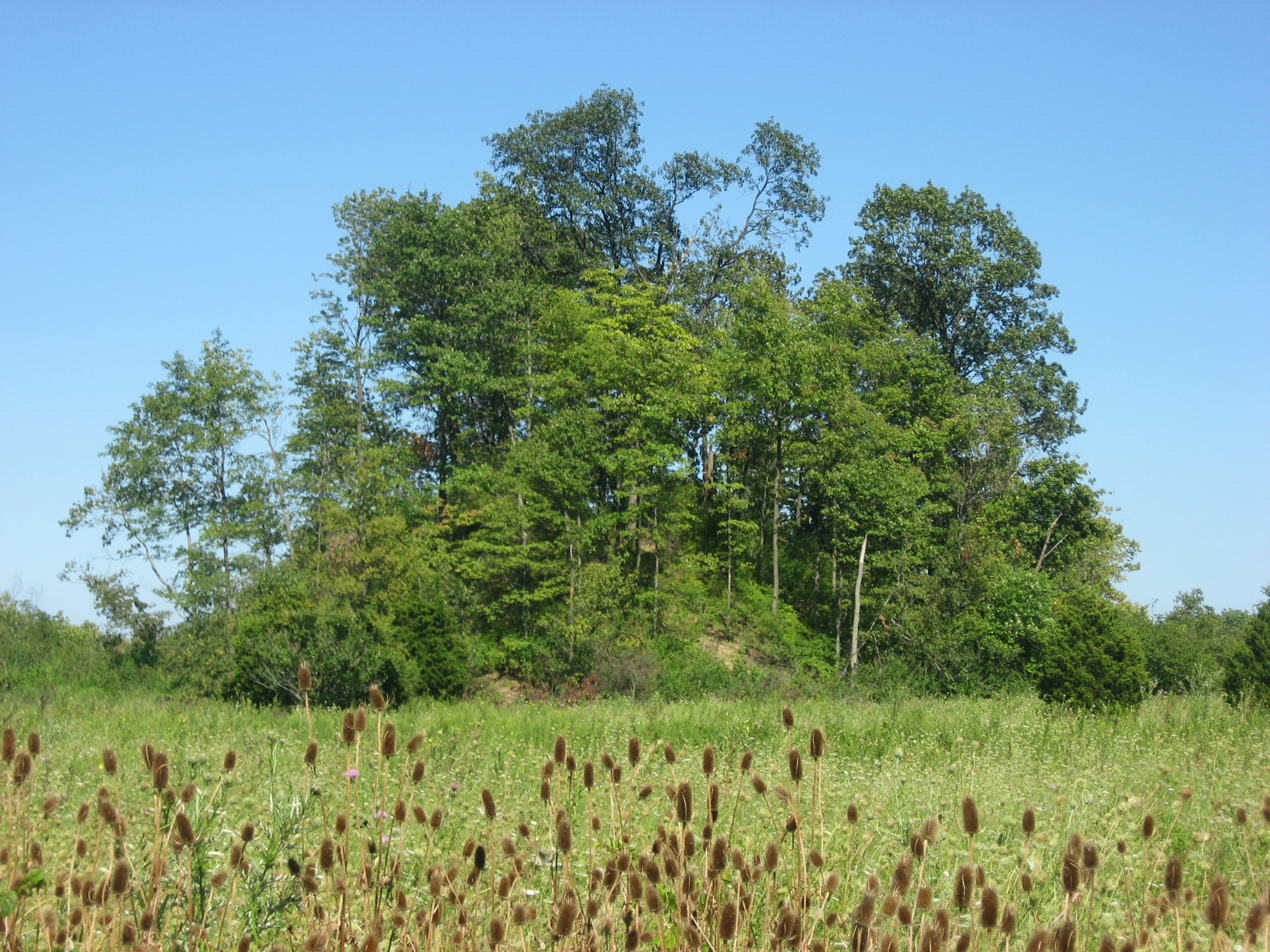
- Western side of the mound

- Location within Ohio Location within the United States
- Nearest city: Middletown, Ohio
- Coordinates: 39°30′55.8″N 84°28′34.5″W
- Area: 1 acre (0.40 ha)
- NRHP reference No.: 71000633
- Added to NRHP: October 7, 1971

The Great Mound is a massive Native American mound in the southwestern part of the U.S. state of Ohio. Located in Section 19 of Madison Township in Butler County, it has a height of 43 feet (13 m) and a circumference of 511 feet (156 m). Its total volume is nearly 825,000 cubic feet (23,400 m^{3}), making it the largest mound in Butler County and one of the largest in southwestern Ohio. Because of the mound's height and its placement on a ridgeline, an individual at the summit can see for a great distance. In the late nineteenth century, it was theorized that mounds such as the Great Mound were built as observation or watch points, and that the builders maintained the ability to light fires atop the mounds as a method of communicating across wide distances. The potential of these mounds for long-distance communication was demonstrated in 1990 by three groups of volunteers. After climbing the Great Mound, the first group established visual contact with the Hill-Kinder Mound in Franklin (more than 11 miles (18 km) to the northeast), from which point the observers of the second group contacted the third group atop the Miamisburg Mound near Dayton.

Built by the Adena culture, the Great Mound has been reduced by multiple instances of unofficial diggings. In 1879, locals removed a small portion of the mound's summit, finding artifacts such as bones and the remnants of fires. Later years saw the destruction of a more significant part of the top; today, only about 75% of the mound is free from disturbances. Nevertheless, the mound is believed to be a significant archaeological site; its size is believed to indicate the stability of the culture that built it and the dedication of its members to commemorating those buried within it. In recognition of its archaeological value, the Great Mound was listed on the National Register of Historic Places in 1971.
