= Wolf Plains =

Archaeological site in Ohio, United States

- U.S. National Register of Historic Places
- U.S. Historic district
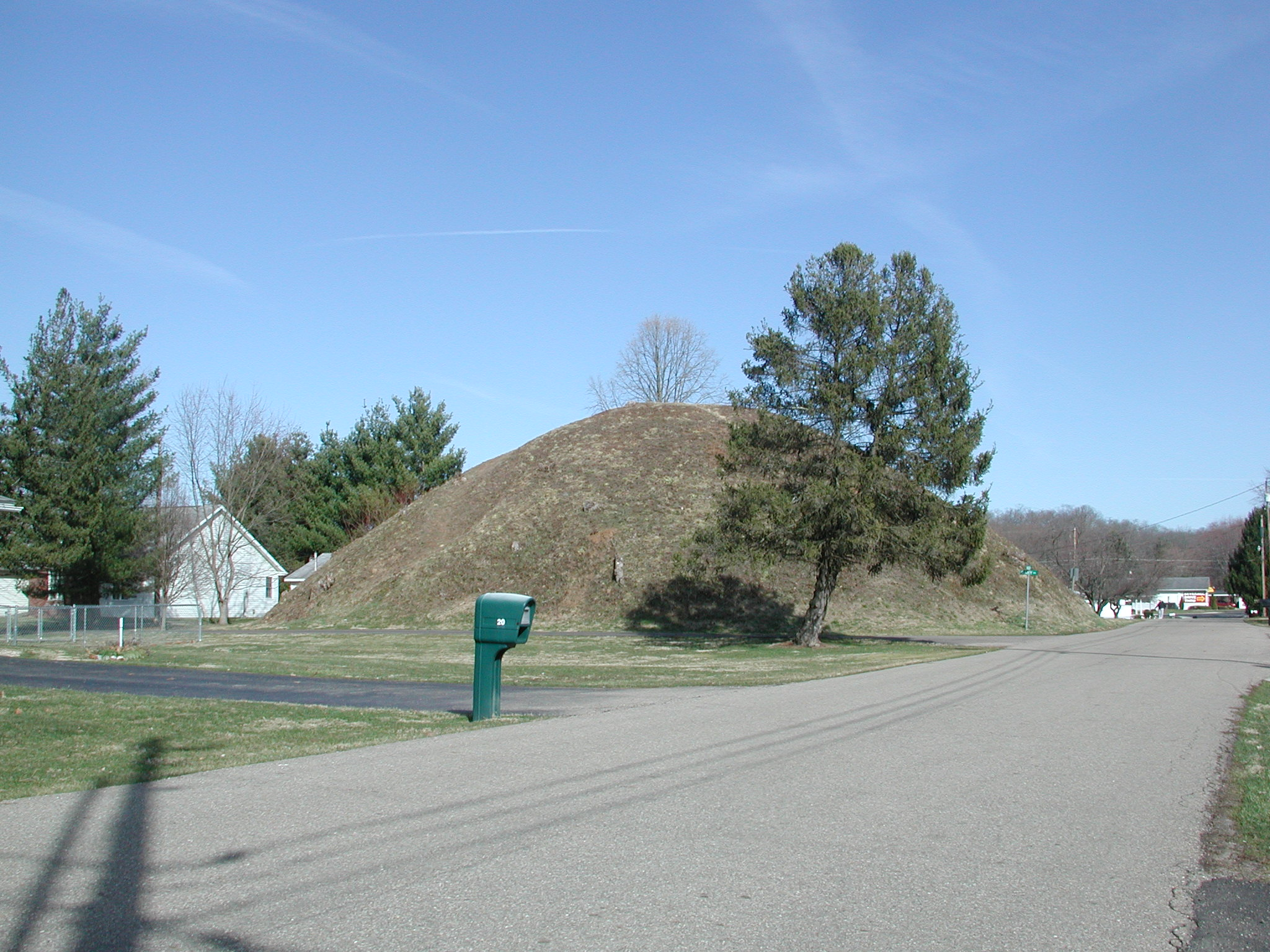
- One of the mounds

- Location within Ohio Location within the United States
- Nearest city: Athens, Ohio
- Coordinates: 39°22′30″N 82°7′27″W
- Area: 2,300 acres (930 ha)
- NRHP reference No.: 74001399
- Added to NRHP: May 31, 1974

The Wolf Plains Group is a Late Adena culture group of 30 earthworks including 22 conical mounds and nine circular enclosures. The Plains, originally known as Wolf's Plains, located a few miles to the northwest of Athens, is a relatively flat terrace in an area of hilly terrain in southeastern Ohio's Hocking River valley. The terrace was formed by glacial outwash coming down the Hocking River, which became dammed at The Plains and found a new outlet to the northeast, leaving the terrace in place.

== Origins ==
The Wolf Plains Group was featured in Ephraim George Squier and Edwin Hamilton Davis's landmark publication Ancient Monuments of the Mississippi Valley (1848). Their finished drawing was based on a sketch from 1836 by S. P. Hildreth, and contains some inaccuracies. Some of the clusters of mounds are rotated relative to their actual position, some are missing, and some are misplaced. The Wolf Plains Group was added to the National Register of Historic Places on May 31, 1974; at that time, 25 earthworks remained in good enough condition to qualify as contributing properties. In 2008 The Archaeological Conservancy purchased the site of one of the remaining earthworks, the Dorr 2 Mound, using emergency POINT funds; and it plans to purchase more as funds become available.

== Destruction of Earthworks ==
The majority of the remaining earthworks in the complex are privately owned and are threatened with destruction as The Plains community expands. The lack of stringent legal protections for these sites on private property exacerbates the risk of potential destruction and alteration of these ancient earthwork. Recent reports have highlighted inadvertent damage to the Adena mounds within the Wolf Plains Group due to development-related activities. This situation underscores the vulnerability of these archaeological sites and the need for heightened protection measures.

== Awareness ==
Despite its historical significance, the awareness and integration of Wolf Plains' Adena culture heritage into local education and community consciousness face challenges. This gap in awareness has been noted by local historians and educators, underlining the need for more comprehensive educational initiatives. Local community groups and residents have shown a growing interest in promoting and preserving the Wolf Plains Group. Efforts such as organizing cultural festivals, enhancing educational materials, and proposing archaeological preserves are underway to protect and celebrate the region's rich Adena heritage. This includes the Indian Mound Festival, which was run by the Plains Lions Club.

== See also ==
- Newark Earthworks
