= Neville, Ohio =

- Village
- Village of Neville
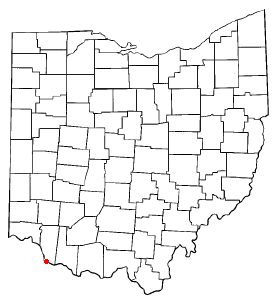
- Location of Neville, Ohio

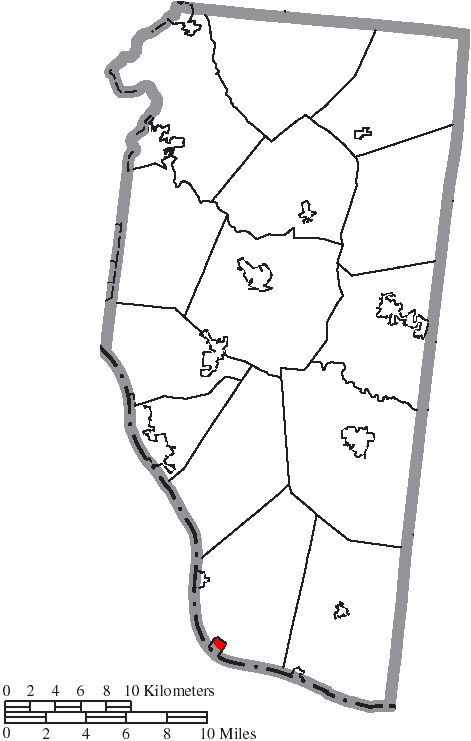
- Location of Neville in Clermont County
- Coordinates: 38°48′44″N 84°12′41″W
- Country: United States
- State: Ohio
- County: Clermont
- Township: Washington
- Platted: 1808

Government
  - Mayor: Rob Gastrich

Area
  - Total: 0.46 sq mi (1.18 km^{2})
  - Land: 0.39 sq mi (1.02 km^{2})
  - Water: 0.062 sq mi (0.16 km^{2})
- Elevation: 492 ft (150 m)

Population (2020)
  - Total: 87
  - Density: 220.5/sq mi (85.12/km^{2})
- Time zone: UTC-5 (Eastern (EST))
  - Summer (DST): UTC-4 (EDT)
- ZIP code: 45156
- Area code: 513
- FIPS code: 39-53956
- GNIS feature ID: 2399448
- Website: https://www.villageofneville.com/

Neville (/nəˈvɪl/ nə-VIL) is a village in Clermont County, Ohio, United States, along the Ohio River. The population was 87 at the 2020 census.

== History ==
Neville was laid out in 1808, and named for Gen. Presley Neville, the original owner of the town site. A post office called Neville has been in operation since 1816.

Since the Ohio River Valley flood in March 1997, the village has lost more than half its population as the Federal Emergency Management Agency purchased about 40% of the village's flood-prone lots. In 2016, Neville survived an initiative on dissolving the village into surrounding Washington Township. Neville faces possible financial insolvency following cuts to the state Local Government Fund, upon which the village relies entirely.

== Geography ==
According to the United States Census Bureau, the village has a total area of 0.46 square miles (1.19 km^{2}), of which 0.40 square miles (1.04 km^{2}) is land and 0.06 square miles (0.16 km^{2}) is water.

== Demographics ==
Historical population
Census	Pop.	Note	%±
1860	404		—
1870	422		4.5%
1880	445		5.5%
1890	340		−23.6%
1900	265		−22.1%
1910	200		−24.5%
1920	128		−36.0%
1930	135		5.5%
1940	127		−5.9%
1950	127		0.0%
1960	164		29.1%
1970	179		9.1%
1980	142		−20.7%
1990	226		59.2%
2000	127		−43.8%
2010	100		−21.3%
2020	87		−13.0%
U.S. Decennial Census

=== 2010 census ===
As of the census of 2010, there were 100 people, 39 households, and 29 families living in the village. The population density was 250.0 inhabitants per square mile (96.5/km^{2}). There were 47 housing units at an average density of 117.5 per square mile (45.4/km^{2}). The racial makeup of the village was 99.0% White and 1.0% Asian.

There were 39 households, of which 28.2% had children under the age of 18 living with them, 59.0% were married couples living together, 7.7% had a female householder with no husband present, 7.7% had a male householder with no wife present, and 25.6% were non-families. 15.4% of all households were made up of individuals, and 5.1% had someone living alone who was 65 years of age or older. The average household size was 2.56 and the average family size was 2.90.

The median age in the village was 43 years. 20% of residents were under the age of 18; 8% were between the ages of 18 and 24; 24% were from 25 to 44; 37% were from 45 to 64; and 11% were 65 years of age or older. The gender makeup of the village was 50.0% male and 50.0% female.

=== 2000 census ===
As of the census of 2000, there were 127 people, 47 households, and 38 families living in the village. The population density was 304.5 inhabitants per square mile (117.6/km^{2}). There were 56 housing units at an average density of 134.3 per square mile (51.9/km^{2}). The racial makeup of the village was 99.21% White and 0.79% African American.

There were 47 households, out of which 44.7% had children under the age of 18 living with them, 55.3% were married couples living together, 19.1% had a female householder with no husband present, and 19.1% were non-families. 17.0% of all households were made up of individuals, and 8.5% had someone living alone who was 65 years of age or older. The average household size was 2.70 and the average family size was 3.03.

In the village, the population was spread out, with 32.3% under the age of 18, 3.9% from 18 to 24, 29.1% from 25 to 44, 25.2% from 45 to 64, and 9.4% who were 65 years of age or older. The median age was 35 years. For every 100 females, there were 95.4 males. For every 100 females age 18 and over, there were 95.5 males.

The median income for a household in the village was $38,125, and the median income for a family was $38,438. Males had a median income of $32,500 versus $23,750 for females. The per capita income for the village was $14,001. There were 18.9% of families and 19.4% of the population living below the poverty line, including 22.9% of under eighteens and none of those over 64.

== Gallery ==
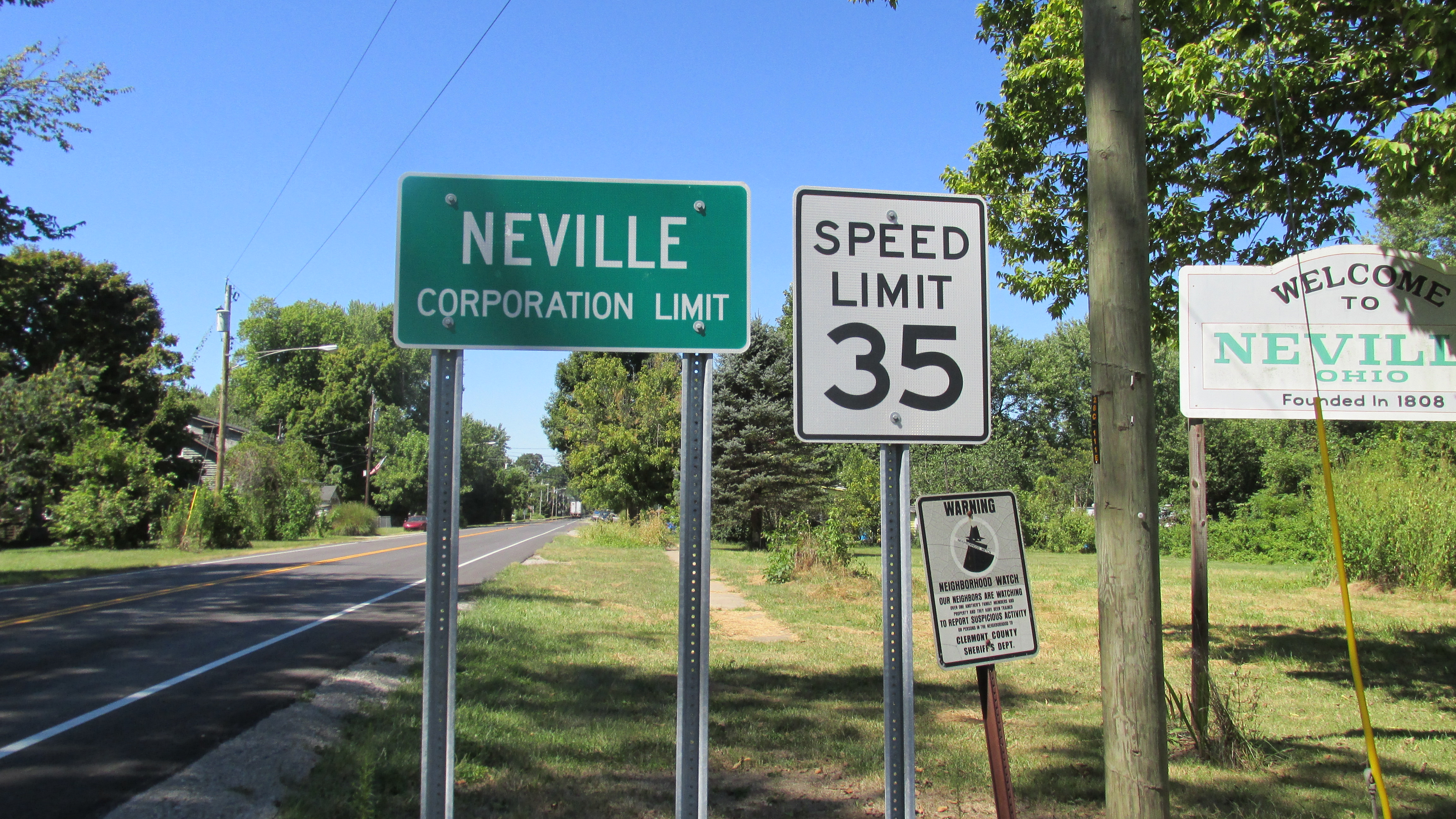
Neville corporation limit sign.

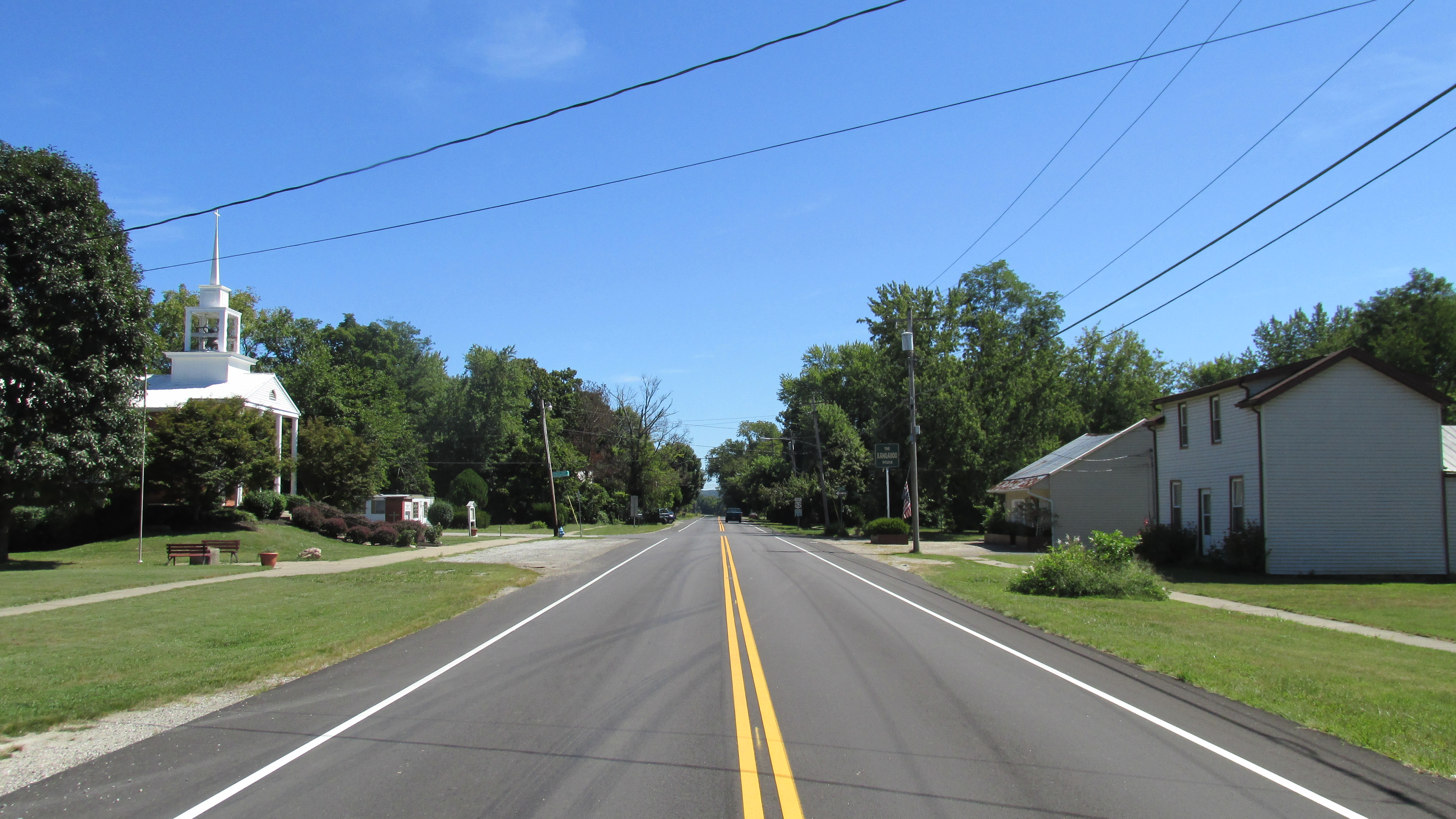
Looking east on US Highway 52 in Neville.

== See also ==
- List of cities and towns along the Ohio River
