= Sayler Park, Cincinnati =

Coordinates: 39°06′45″N 84°41′21″W

Sayler Park
- Neighborhood of Cincinnati
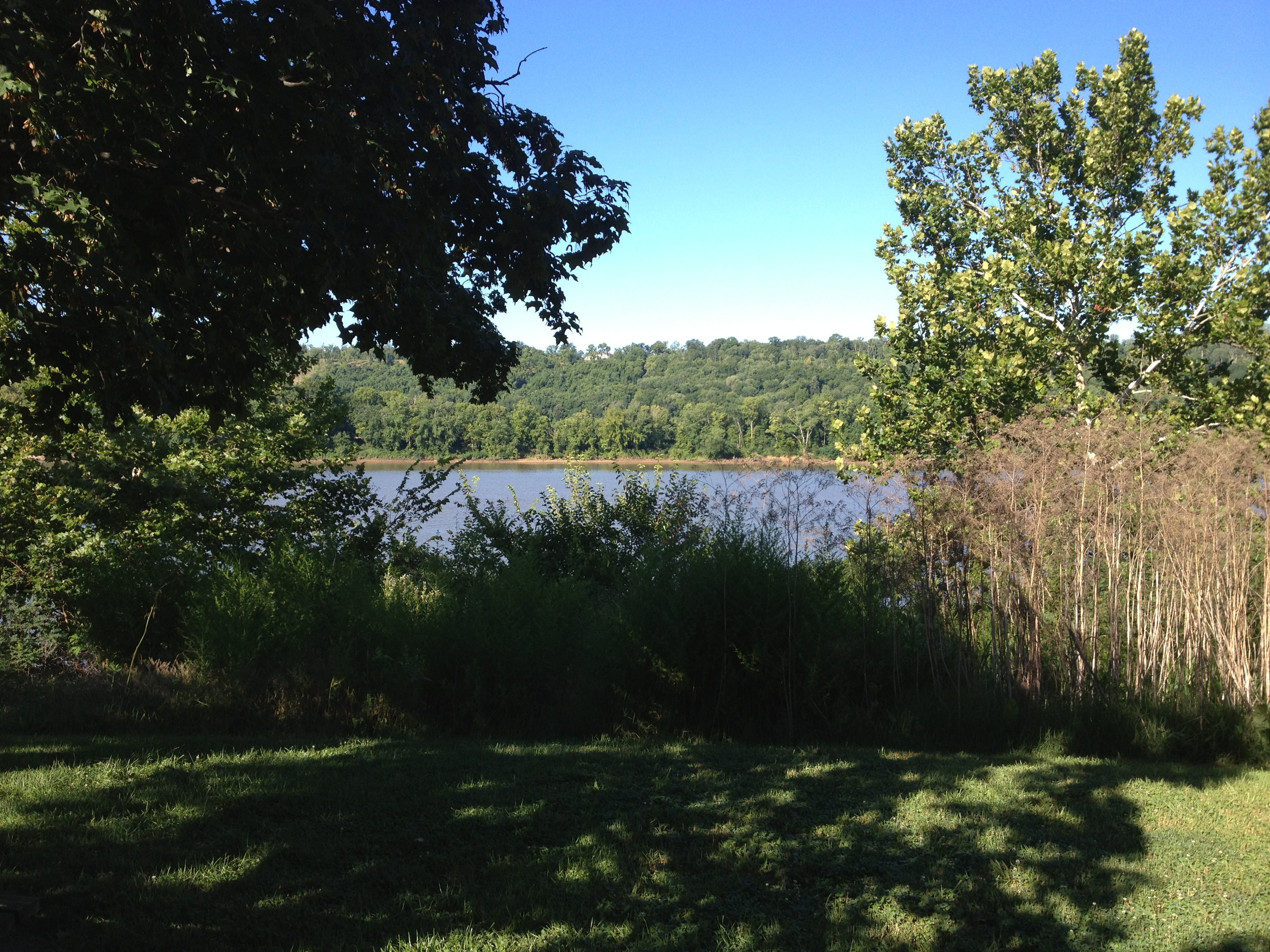
- The Ohio River as seen from Fernbank Park in Sayler Park Ohio

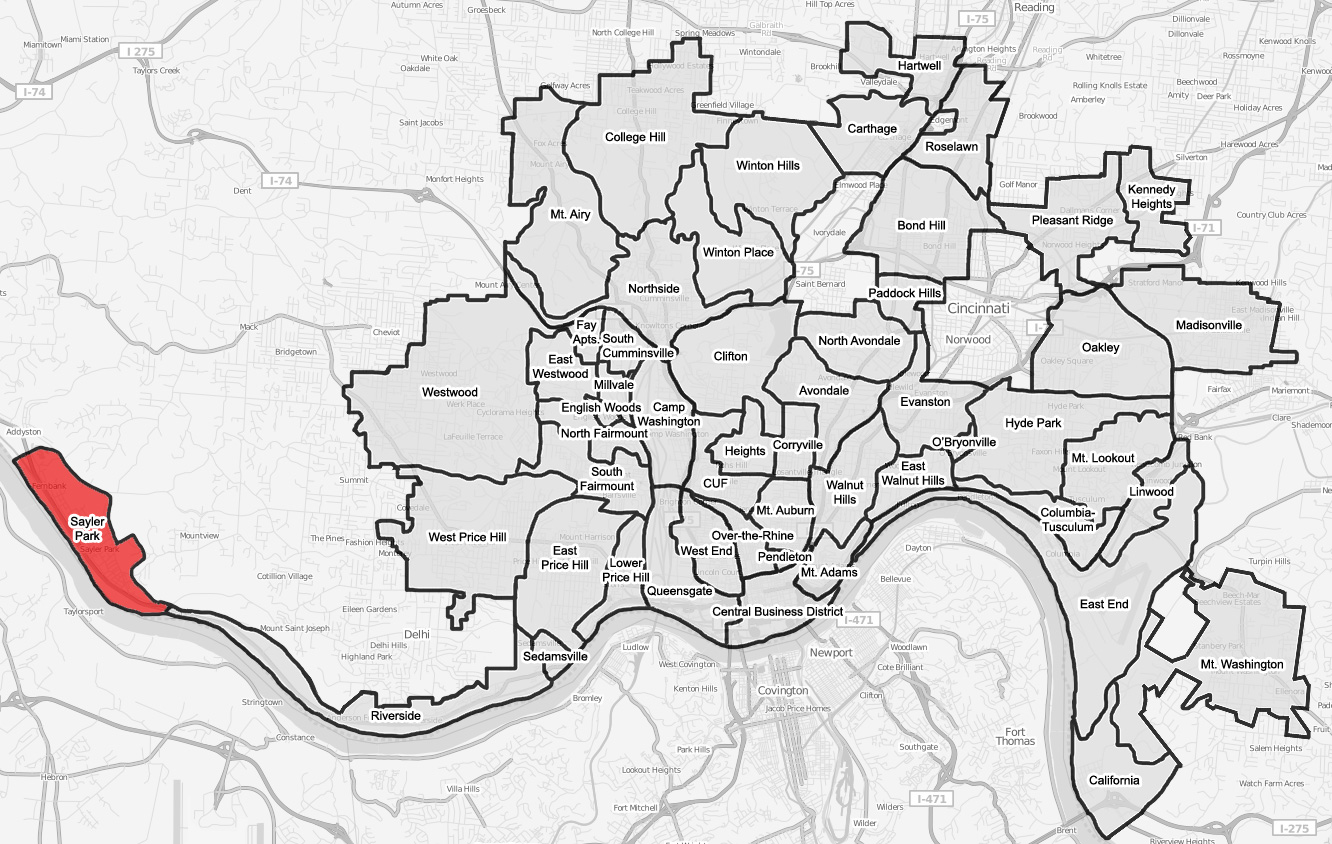
- Sayler Park (red) within Cincinnati, Ohio
- Country: United States
- State: Ohio
- County: Hamilton
- City: Cincinnati

Population (2020)
  - Total: 2,825

Sayler Park is one of the 52 neighborhoods of Cincinnati, Ohio. Situated along the Ohio River, it is the westernmost neighborhood in the city. The population was 2,825 at the 2020 census.

== History ==
Sayler Park was originally known as Home City. Sayler Park was annexed by the City of Cincinnati in 1911. The neighborhood was struck by an F5 tornado in 1974 during the Super Outbreak, killing three people and destroying several homes.

== Demographics ==
Population of Sayler Park 1900-2020
Year	Pop.	±%
1900	2,000	—
1910	2,013	+0.6%
1920	2,075	+3.1%
1930	2,352	+13.3%
1940	2,627	+11.7%
1950	2,990	+13.8%
1960	3,165	+5.9%
1970	3,430	+8.4%
1980	3,384	−1.3%
1990	3,516	+3.9%
2000	3,233	−8.0%
2010	2,765	−14.5%
2020	2,825	+2.2%

As of the census of 2020, there were 2,825 people living in the neighborhood. There were 1,312 housing units. The racial makeup of the neighborhood was 86.8% White, 5.6% Black or African American, 0.2% Native American, 0.3% Asian, 0.0% Pacific Islander, 0.7% from some other race, and 6.4% from two or more races. 2.1% of the population were Hispanic or Latino of any race.

There were 1,193 households, out of which 73.0% were families. 24.0% of all households were made up of individuals.

23.6% of the neighborhood's population were under the age of 18, 60.3% were 18 to 64, and 16.1% were 65 years of age or older. 49.4% of the population were male and 50.6% were female.

According to the U.S. Census American Community Survey, for the period 2016-2020 the estimated median annual income for a household in the neighborhood was $56,918. About 14.7% of family households were living below the poverty line. About 23.8% of adults had a bachelor's degree or higher.

== Parks ==
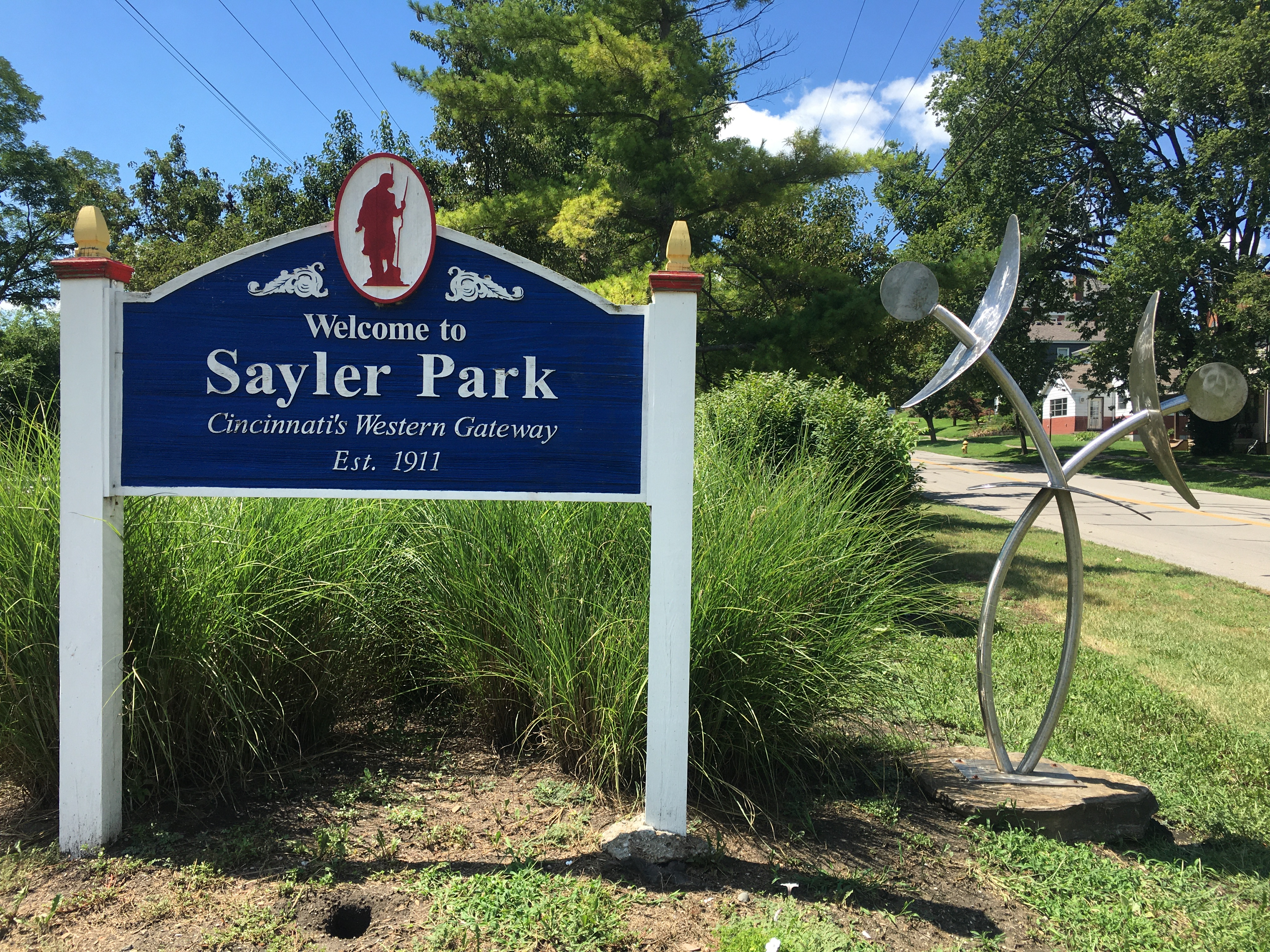
Gateway feature off U.S. Route 50 (River Road) for Sayler Park.

The 65-acre (26 ha) Fernbank Park in Sayler Park stretches over a mile along the Ohio River. The Thornton Triangle is Cincinnati's smallest municipal park.
