= William Snyder Webb =

American academic and anthropologist

William Snyder Webb (19 January 1882 – 15 February 1964) was an American academic and anthropologist.

Born in Greendale, Kentucky, (Note: Greendale was a former Fayette County, Kentucky community located off the Georgetown Pike just north of Lexington, Kentucky.) Webb studied at the University of Kentucky, Cornell University and the University of Chicago. He learned to speak Seminole as secretary to the commander of what is now Oklahoma. Webb became an assistant professor of physics at the University of Kentucky in 1908 and was promoted to department head in 1915. During the First World War he enlisted with the 84th Infantry Division, rising to the rank of Major.

When a department of archaeology and anthropology was established at the University of Kentucky in 1926, Webb became its first head. The two-member department wrote several books on Kentucky in prehistoric times. Beginning in 1933, Webb coordinated archaeological excavations in the Tennessee Valley. He was granted an honorary doctorate from the University of Alabama in 1937, though because of fears that he would not agree to accept the degree, he was tricked into traveling to the school and "captured" shortly before the award ceremony.

Webb was president of the Central States Branch of the American Anthropological Association, vice-president of the Society of American Archaeology, and honorary president of the Kentucky Archaeological Society. He received the title of "Distinguished Professor" in 1950. He also held "various national offices in physics organizations". His "extensive list of site reports...perhaps constitute his major contribution to American archaeology". Webb officially retired in 1952, though he still continued his research until his death.
