= Causewayed ring ditch =

Neolithic earthwork structure

A causewayed ring ditch is a type of prehistoric monument.

It comprises a roughly circular ditch, segmented by several causeways which cross it. Within the ditch is a central area used for inhumations and cremations, usually covered beneath a barrow. They are considerably smaller than the causewayed enclosures they resemble.

In the British Isles they date to the Neolithic period.
