= Ohio History Center =

History museum in Columbus, Ohio

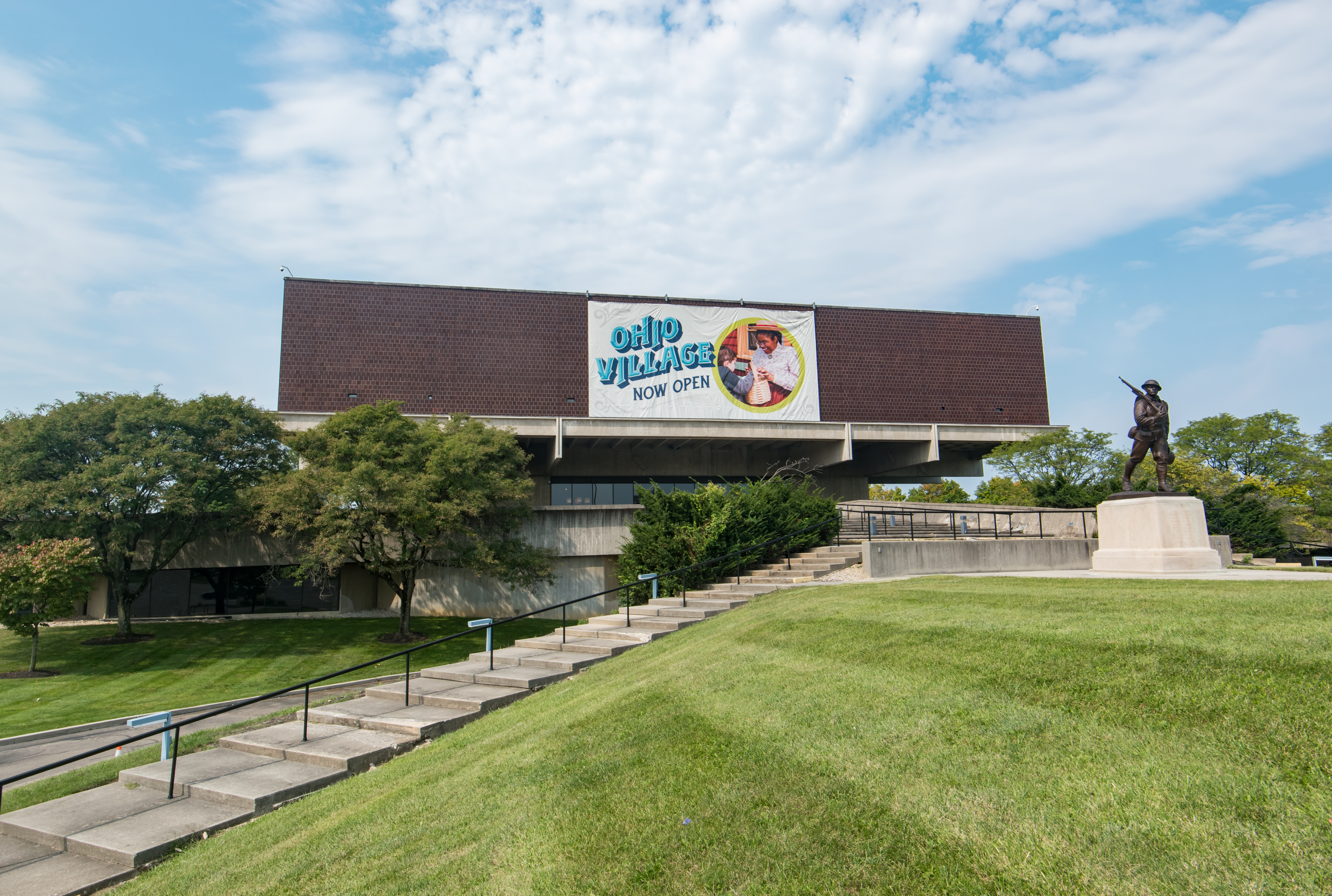
- Established: August 23, 1970
- Location: 800 E. 17th Avenue, Columbus, Ohio
- Coordinates: 40.004858°N 82.987418°W
- Accreditation: American Alliance of Museums
- Key people: Burt Logan (Executive Director and CEO), Thomas V. Chema (President)
- Architect: Ireland & Associates
- Owner: Ohio History Connection
- Parking: Surface lots
- Website: www.ohiohistory.org/visit/ohio-history-center

U.S. National Register of Historic Places
- Designated: May 5, 2023
- Reference no.: 100008897
- Listed with: Ohio Village

The Ohio History Center is a history museum and research center in Columbus, Ohio. It is the primary museum for Ohio's history, and is the headquarters, offices, and library of the Ohio History Connection. The building also houses Ohio's state archives, also managed by the Ohio History Connection. The museum is located at the Ohio State Fairgrounds, site of the Ohio State Fair, and a short distance north of downtown. The history center opened in 1970 as the Ohio Historical Center, moving the museum from its former site by the Ohio State University. The building was designed by Ireland & Associates in the Brutalist style. It was listed on the National Register of Historic Places along with the Ohio Village in 2023.

== Attributes ==
The Ohio History Center is the headquarters of the Ohio History Connection, which also operates dozens of state historic sites across Ohio.

Extensive exhibits cover Ohio's history from the Ice Age to the present. The Center includes state archives and library spaces, a gift shop, and administrative and educational facilities. The 1989 Smithsonian Guide to Historic America described the center as "probably the finest museum in America devoted to pre-European history."

=== Architecture ===
==== Site and exterior ====
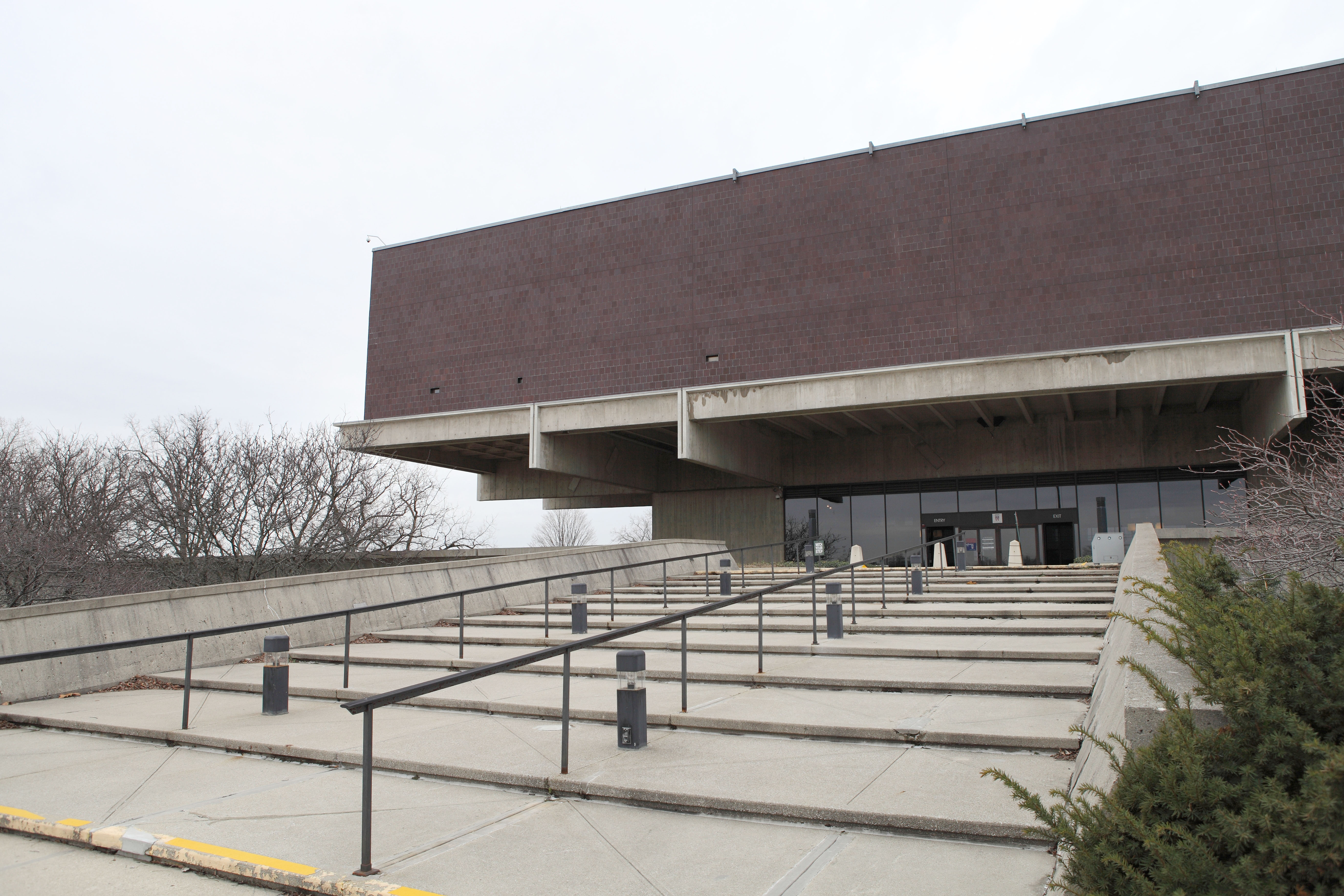
Original entranceway

The museum is located in a highly visible site on Interstate 71, a major north–south highway constructed just before the center was, and connecting the museum directly to Ohio's three largest cities. The highway's southbound side approaches the museum's north and east facades, revealing it at a distance before passing directly by its east side. The museum site is wide and open, with the free-standing structure appearing as a monument in its center.

It was designed by the Columbus architectural firm Ireland & Associates, newly formed by W. Byron Ireland after the death of his former employer, Eero Saarinen. The building reflects trends of 1960s planning and design.

The building is in the Brutalist architecture style, featuring a monumental scale, exposed concrete (béton brut), and simple use of other materials. Although some of the building's concrete is smooth, most at eye-level is board form concrete, where lumber is used to form its shape. When removed, the boards leave wood grain impressions in the concrete. Other materials used include Ohio-made silo tiles, dark-stained oak, terrazzo, and glass.

W. Byron Ireland designed the building with post-tensioned concrete structures, allowing for a cantilevered design. The building remains mostly as built, including its exterior use of silo tiles.

The building's innovative architecture led it to being the cover feature of the Architectural Record in July 1971. The journal called it the most architecturally significant public building built in Ohio since the Ohio Statehouse over a century earlier. It also won the First Honor Award of the AIA/ALA Library Buildings Award Program in 1972.

==== Layout and interior ====
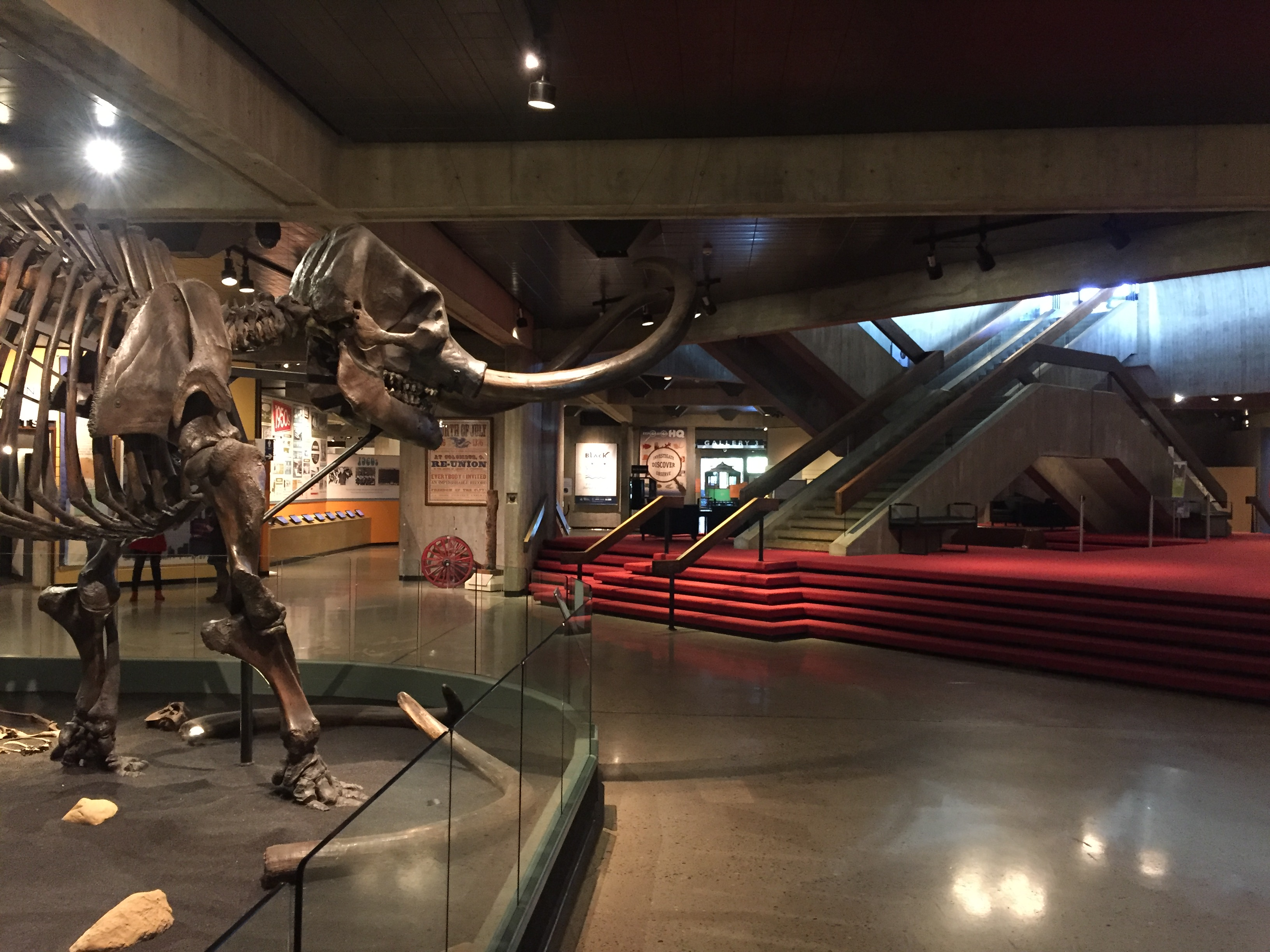
First-floor museum lobby

The building has 271,762 sq ft (25,247.5 m^{2}) of floor space. Currently, the first floor holds the building's museum space, auditorium, gift shop, and a classroom. Its second-floor plaza contains more exhibit space as well seating. The third floor holds the building's archives and library, a classroom, conference room, and microfilm room.

Its first floor has a triangular plan, with concave, gently curving sides. Each corner of the triangles were originally used to house specialties of the museum: history, archaeology, and natural history. The plan utilized platforms and sunken spaces, allowing objects to be displayed without cases. Most of the original system has been removed to make the museum more accessible to mobility-impaired guests. Remaining space on the first floor included offices and workshops on the perimeter of the triangle, and collections storage rooms in close proximity to their display spaces.

The building overall was designed to sandwich together the society's multiple functions previously held in separate locations. The lower floor acts as a museum and library, while the upper three floors hold offices and archives, and the small glass-walled lobby in between these layers connects the two. It was also designed to circulate guests efficiently, with school groups entering from the west at a school bus drop-off area and exiting the east side, and general visitors entering the east side by parking lots, though the main entrance has since been relocated.

The museum's three-story reading room has dark oak tables designed for it. The material was also used in doors, handrails, and trim throughout the building. The doors on the building's upper three floors have rounded corners at their top. The corners distribute weight from the concrete and books stored above them, preventing them from cracking.

The first-floor roof appears as a raised podium, largely grass-covered, and mounded over the building's auditorium and offices.

== History ==
The Ohio History Connection, known in the 20th century as the Ohio Historical Society, lacked a permanent building of its own until 1914. The society's first permanent home was at the Ohio State Museum (now known as Sullivant Hall) on the Ohio State University campus. The society operated its museum and library there. The society began hosting the state archives at the Old Governor's Mansion on Broad Street in the 1950s. Both facilities became overcrowded in the 1960s, and were miles apart, leading the organization to begin searching for a new home. In 1964, Governor Jim Rhodes proposed $290 million for state projects, including a new historical center. Voters approved a bond for a new structure to be built in May 1965, and plans were underway for the museum by October, to be built on 58 acres (23 ha) of undeveloped land. The museum was completed in 1970.

In 1971, the new museum was projected to bring 300,000 visitors, about ten times more than the previous museum.

The building was listed on the National Register of Historic Places along with the Ohio Village in 2023.

== Curators ==
The Ohio History Connection has appointed a Curator of Archaeology to oversee the museum's archaeological collection since 1894:

- Warren K. Moorehead (1894–1897)
- Clarence Loveberry (1897–1898)
- Lucy Allen (1898)
- William Corless Mills (1898–1921)
- Henry C. Shetrone (1921–1928)
- Emerson Greenman (1928–1935)
- Richard G. Morgan (1936–1948)
- Raymond S. Baby (1948–1979)
- Martha Potter Otto (1974–2009)
- Brad Lepper (2009–present)

== Gallery ==
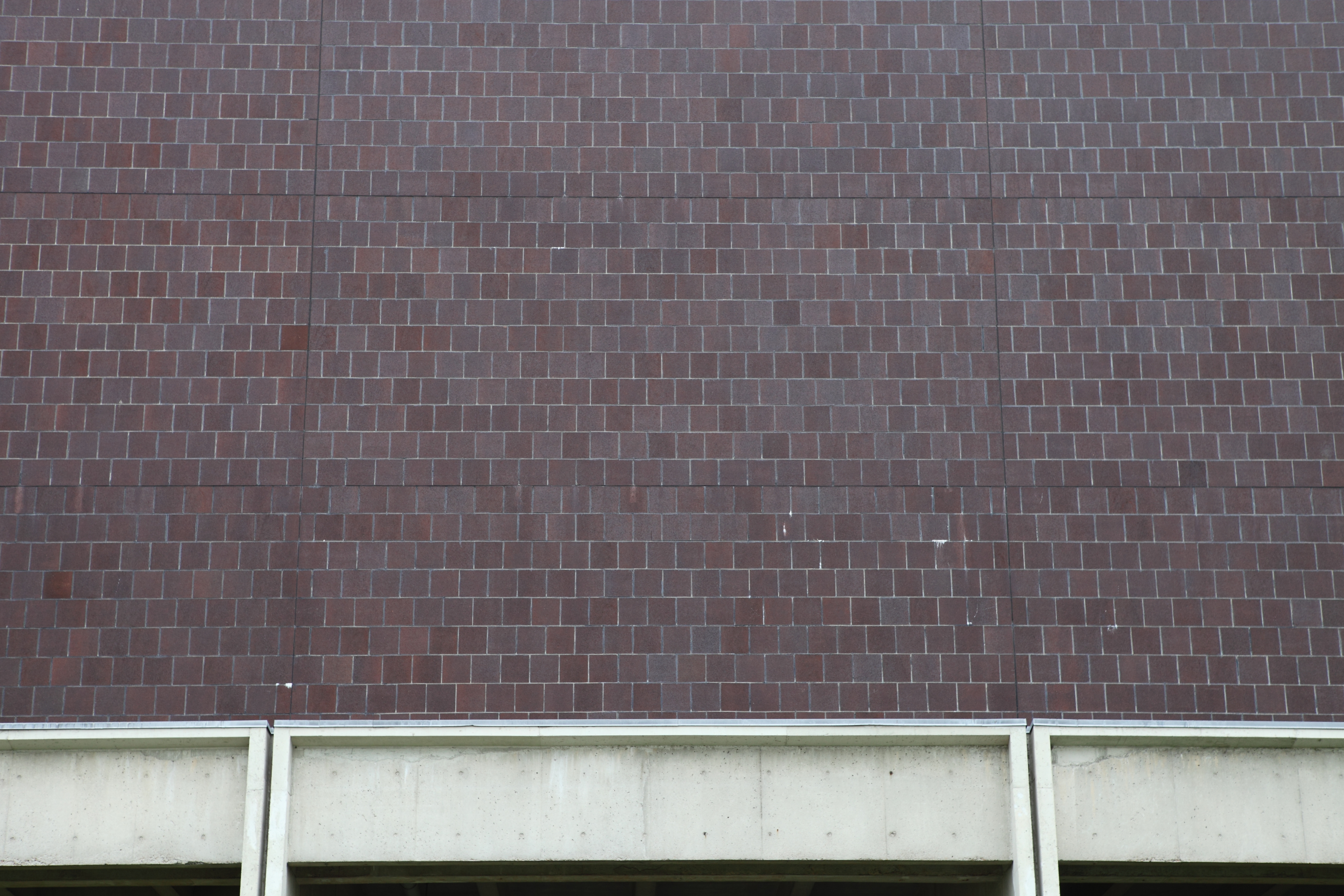
Closeup of exterior tiles

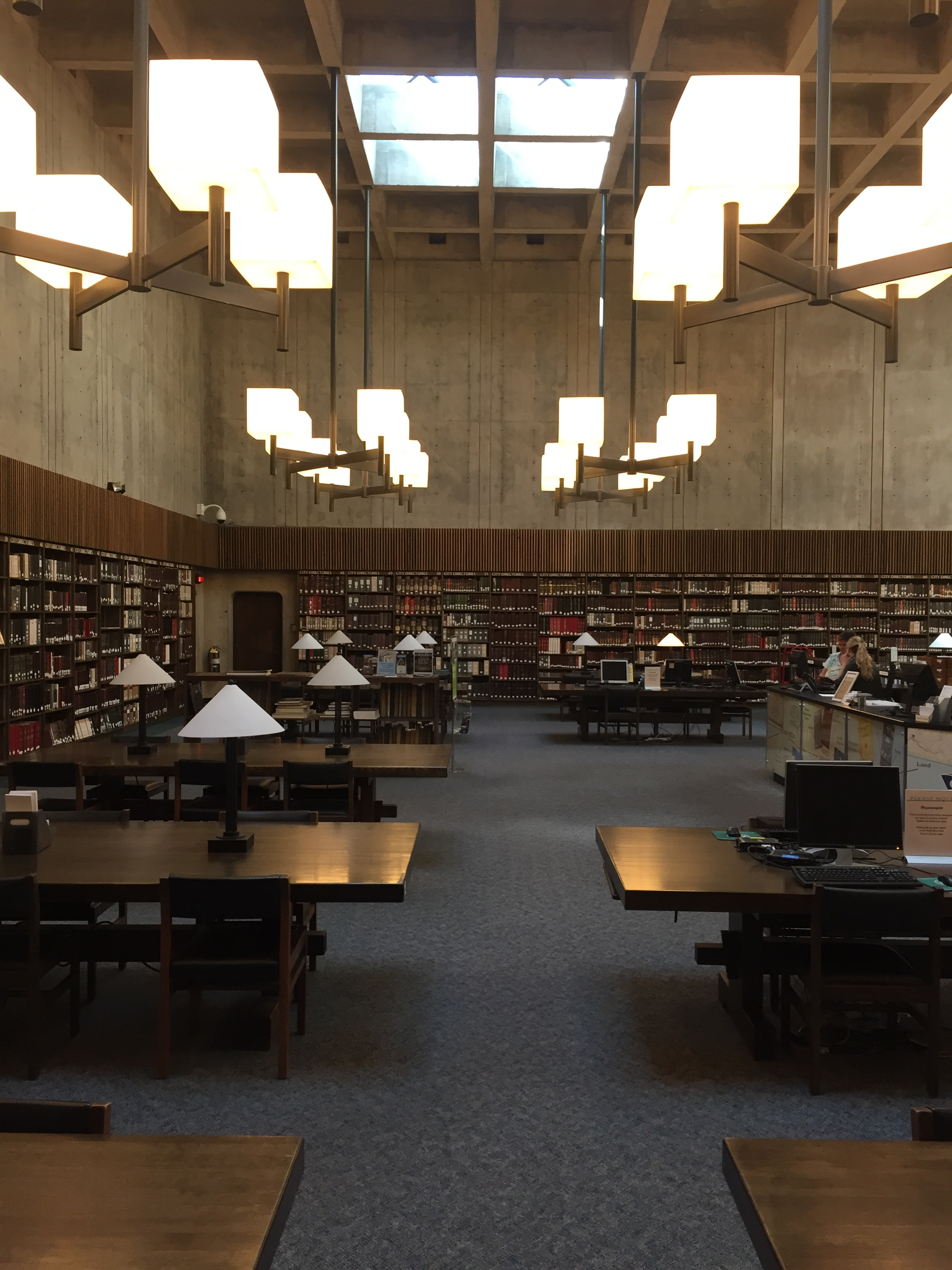
Reading room

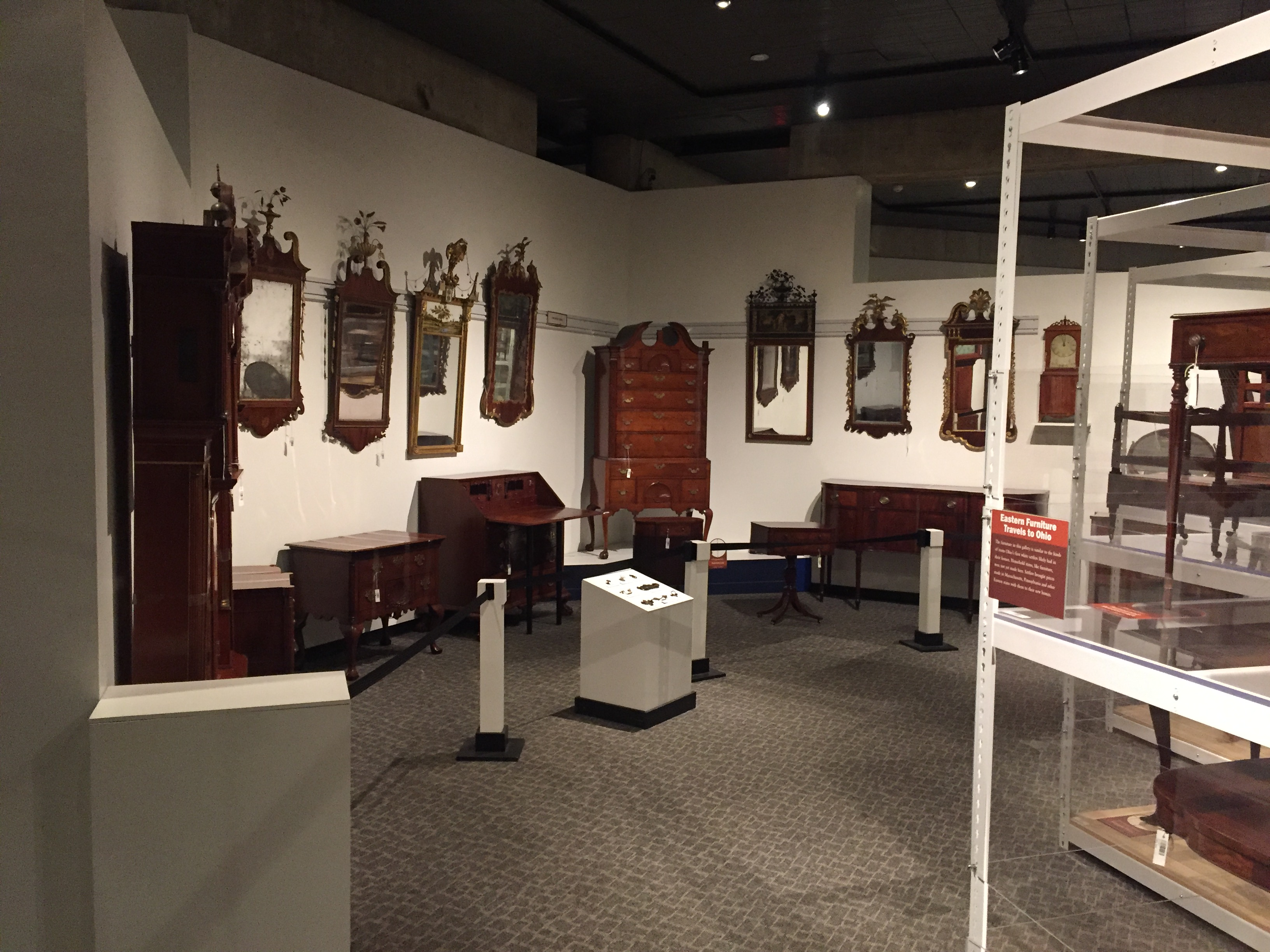
Exhibit space

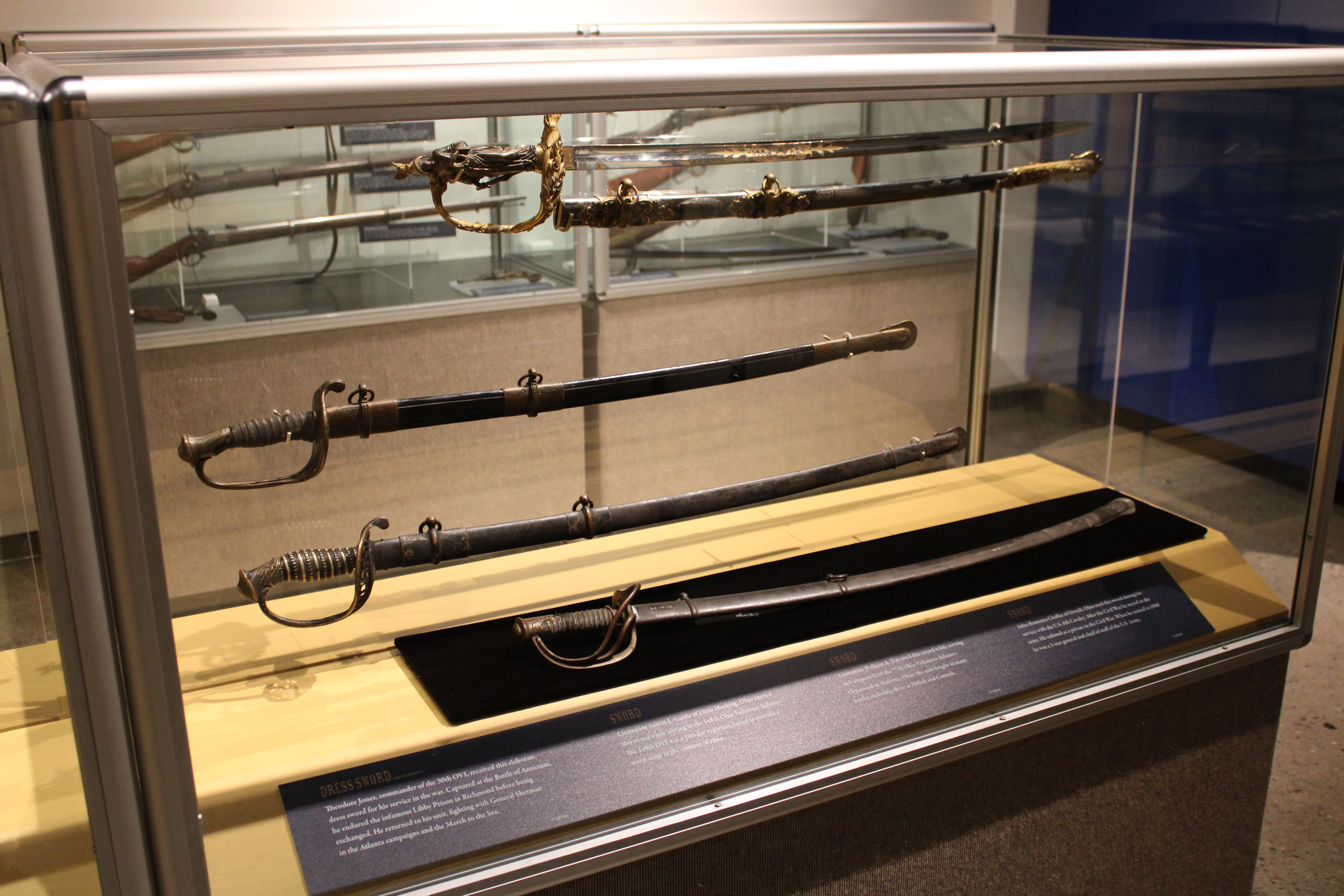
Civil War-era swords

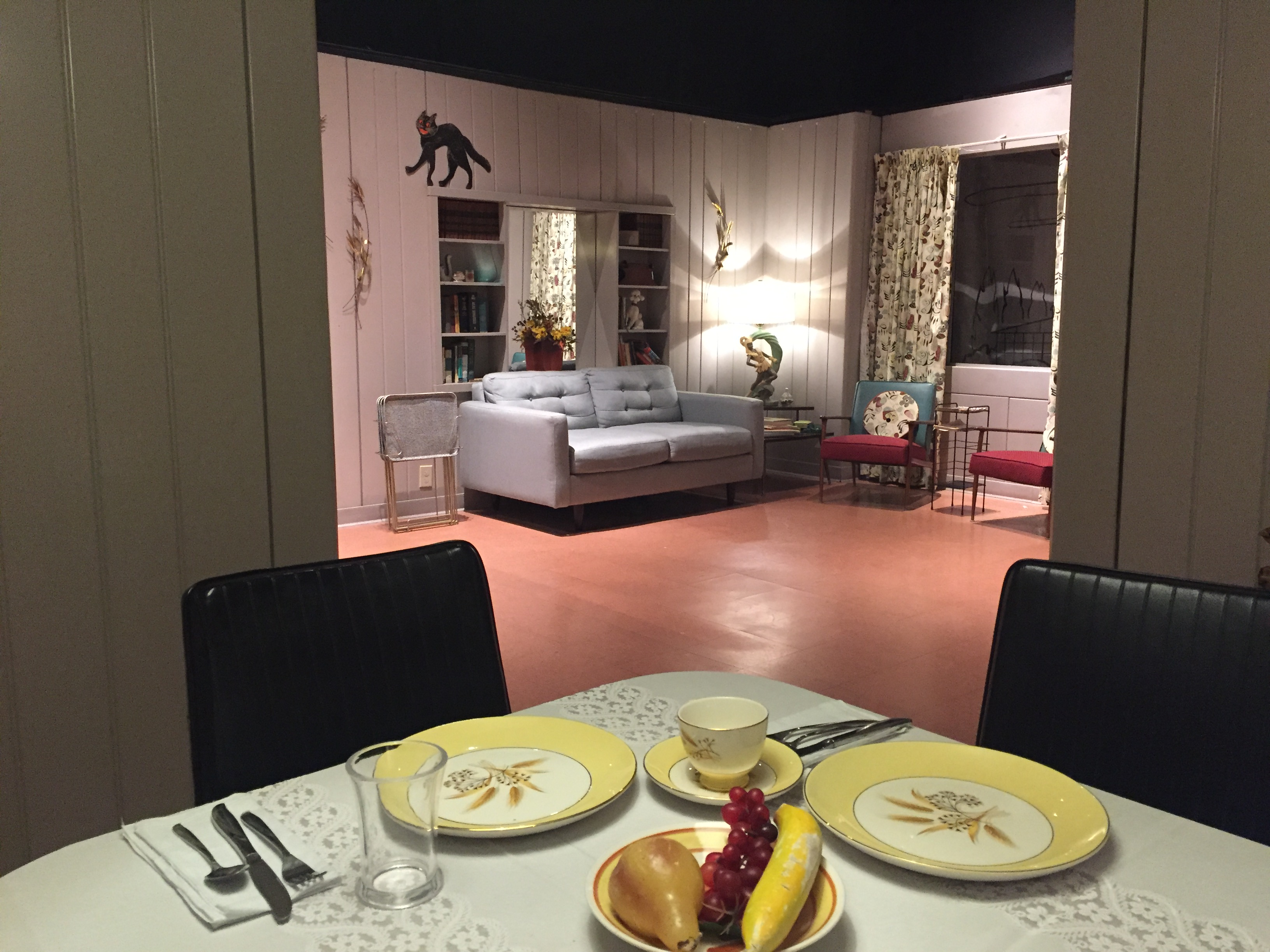
1950s house display

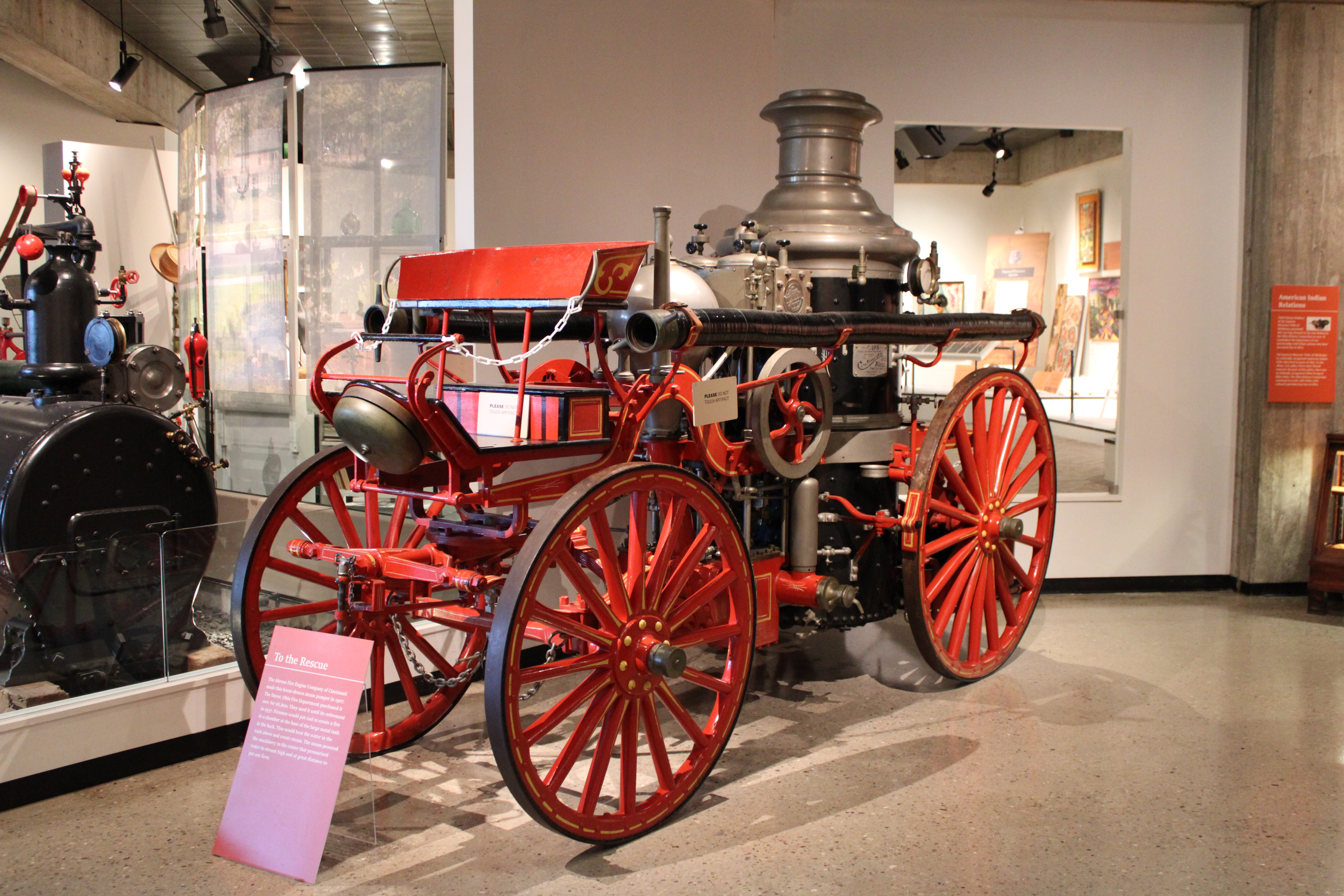
Steam-powered fire engine

== See also ==
- List of museums in Columbus, Ohio
- National Register of Historic Places listings in Columbus, Ohio
- Ohio Village
