= Ohio Village =

Living history museum in Columbus, Ohio

- U.S. National Register of Historic Places
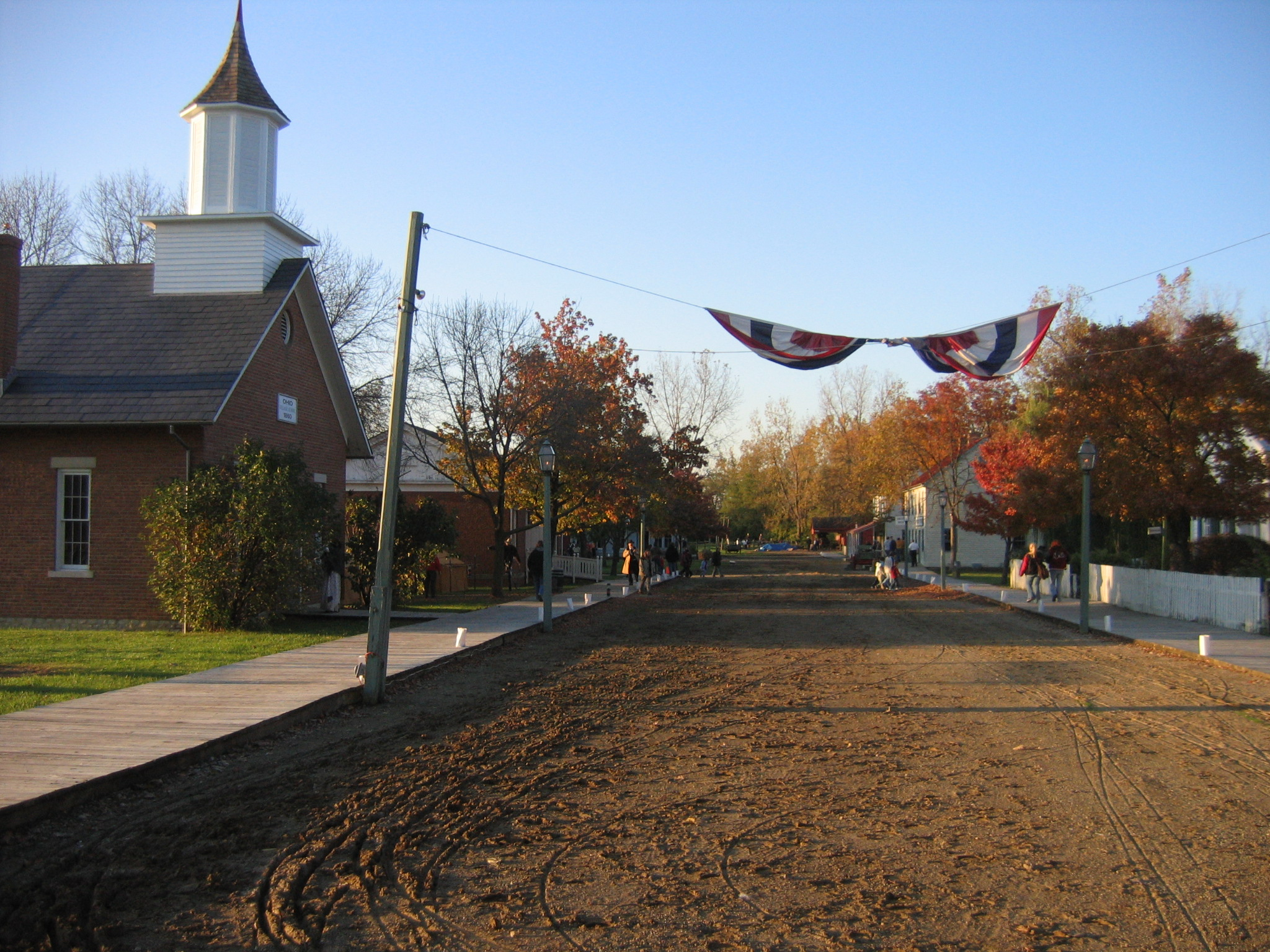
- Location: 800 E. 17th Avenue, Columbus, Ohio
- Coordinates: 40°00′27″N 82°59′16″W
- Website: Official website
- NRHP reference No.: 100008897
- Added to NRHP: May 5, 2023 (with the Ohio History Center)

Ohio Village is a living history museum in Columbus, Ohio, United States. It is operated by the non-profit Ohio History Connection.

The village, intended to provide a firsthand view of life in Ohio during the American Civil War, opened July 27, 1974, on 15 acres (61,000 m^{2}) adjacent to the Ohio History Center in north Columbus. The Ohio Village is open to visitors Memorial Day weekend through Labor Day.

The annual All Hallow's Eve is an 1860s-style celebration of Halloween that has taken place in late October every year since 1985. The festivities include fortunetelling, costumed interpretation of beliefs and superstitions related to the season, and a parade for the dead through the town center meant to appease roaming spirits. The night culminates in a production of Washington Irving's Legend of Sleepy Hollow.

Ohio Village is also home to two historic baseball teams, the Ohio Village Muffins and Lady Diamonds. Both teams play by the 19th-century rules of the game, very similar to those followed by the New York Knickerbockers, an early baseball club, in 1845. The Ohio Cup Vintage Base Ball Festival, held at the village every year over Labor Day weekend, draws teams from across the country to compete in a festival played by the old rules.

The museum was listed on the National Register of Historic Places along with the Ohio History Center in 2023. It closed after the 2024 Ohio State Fair and is scheduled to reopen in 2026.

== See also ==
- List of museums in Columbus, Ohio
- National Register of Historic Places listings in Columbus, Ohio
