= W. Byron Ireland =

American architect

William Byron Ireland (c. 1930–December 24, 1982) was a nationally known American architect. He was known for his design of the Ohio History Center, which Architectural Record considered the most architecturally significant public structure constructed in the state since the Ohio Statehouse was completed in the 1860s.

Ireland served as president of AIA Columbus and the Ohio Arts Council, as a member of the Ohio Historic Site Preservation Advisory Board, and was the youngest person awarded as a Fellow of the American Institute of Architects.

== Life ==
W. Byron Ireland was born in Detroit, Michigan, and grew up in Columbus, Ohio. His father was one of the founders of the Big Bear Stores.

Ireland graduated from the Ohio State University with a Bachelor of Science degree in business administration in 1952. He proceeded to join the U.S. Air Force, becoming a captain and performing intelligence work during the Korean War, when he thought to study architecture. In 1958 he earned a Masters of Architecture degree from Harvard University's Harvard Graduate School of Design, and entered the competition to design Toronto City Hall. Ireland's team won second place in the competition. Early in his career, he worked for the firm of Eero Saarinen. He later formed his own firm, Ireland and Associates, in Columbus in 1962. Around this time, he also served as president of AIA Columbus and the Ohio Arts Council.

In 1968, Ireland was one of three architecture judges in the Junior League of Columbus's Planning Landscape and Architectural Needs contest, which aimed to help preserve and restore historic buildings, encourage new developments, new landscaping, and make use of decorative arts to improve the community.

During the proposed demolition of the Ohio State University's historic University Hall in 1970, Ireland joined the Committee for Rehabilitation of University Hall. He advocated for the building to be gutted and renovated instead of replaced, believing it would save Ohio State up to 40 percent of the cost. The building was nevertheless demolished and replaced.

In 1976, Ireland's firm led renovations to the Gen. William Henry Harrison Headquarters in Columbus. In 1978, Ireland & Associates moved its offices within Columbus, and renamed itself W. Byron Ireland, FAIA, Inc.

Ireland moved to California around 1980 for freelance work. On December 24, 1982, he died in Palo Alto, California, of a heart attack, at the age of 52. He was survived by three sons, a daughter, and a former wife, Mary Ellen Ireland.

Ireland, known to his friends as Byron, was the youngest person awarded as a Fellow of the American Institute of Architects, in 1972. He won numerous awards for his works. He served multiple terms in the Ohio Historic Site Preservation Advisory Board, appointed by Governor Jim Rhodes.

Ireland was a member of the First Community Church, the Masonic Blue Lodge, the Scottish Rite, Aladdin Temple Shrine, and Alpha Tau Omega fraternity.

== Works ==
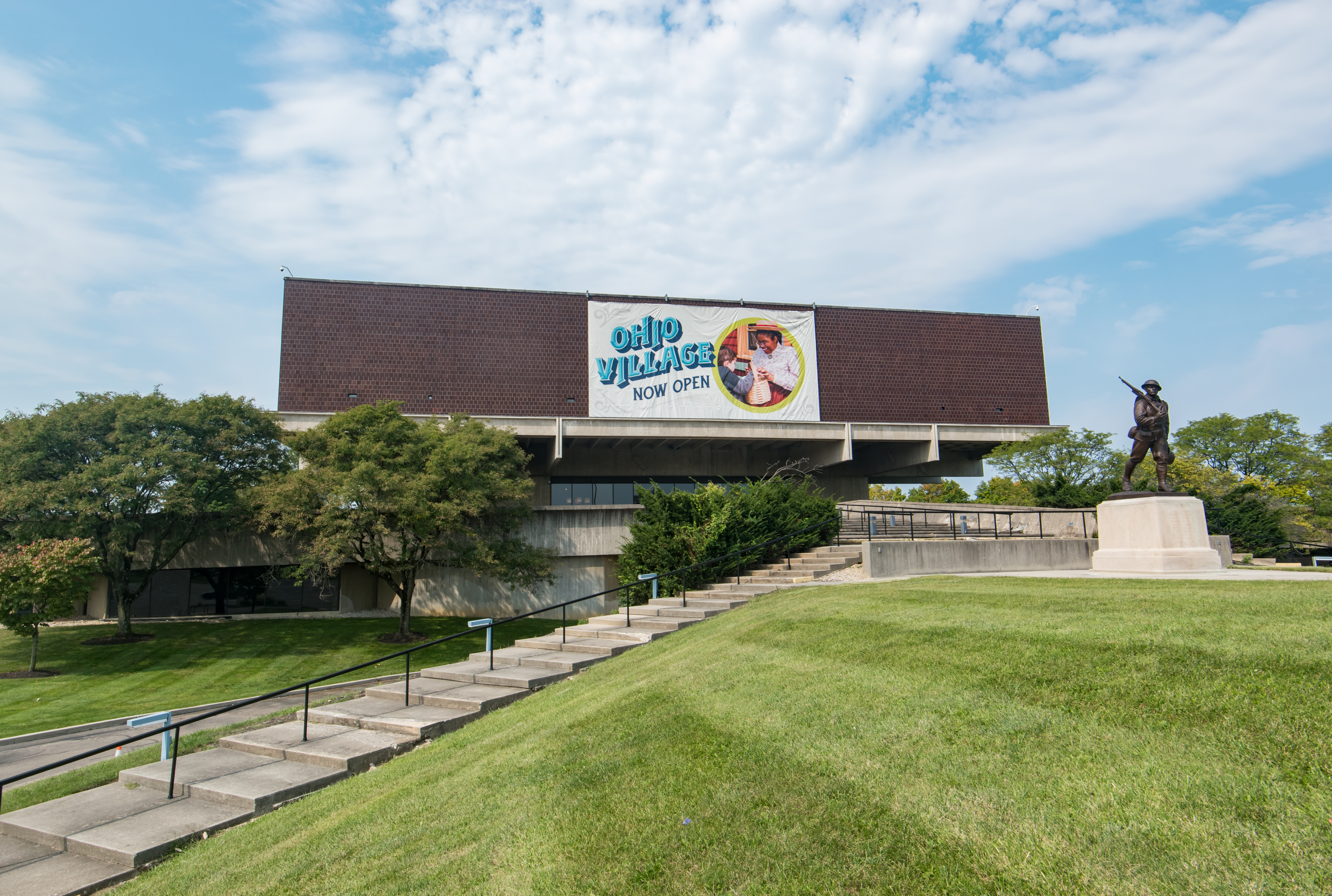
The Ohio History Center

Under Eero Saarinen:

- Project manager for the Gateway Arch
- TWA Flight Center
- CBS Building

As part of Ireland and Associates, Ireland designed about 9,000 structures and residences:

- Ohio History Center, Columbus, Ohio
- Golden Bear Shopping Center, Upper Arlington, Ohio
- Public Employees Retirement System Building, 277 E. Town St., Columbus, Ohio (since remodeled)
- Wyandotte East apartments, 5204 E. Main St., Columbus, Ohio
- Wyandotte North apartments, 6175 Northgate Rd., Columbus, Ohio
