= Lucy Allen Smart =

American librarian and curator (1877-1960)

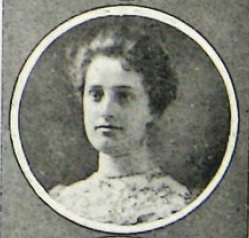
- Born: January 12, 1877; Steubenville, Ohio
- Died: September 7, 1960 (aged 83); Forest Hills, Queens
- Spouse: George Smart

Lucy Allen Smart (née Lucy Allen, 1877–1960) was an American librarian and curator.

== Work at Ohio State ==
Allen began her studies to become a librarian at Ohio State University in 1894. While there she assisted Warren K. Moorehead, professor of archaeology at Ohio State and the curator of the Ohio State Archaeological and Historical Society's museum, in compiling a catalogue and map of archaeological sites in the state. Moorehead was forced to resign his post in 1897 when he contracted tuberculosis. He recommended that Allen finish the catalogue, saying that she knew the material "better than any other person – next to myself". She also took over his role as curator for a five-month period in 1898. Her successor, William Corless Mills, revised and expanded Moorehead and Allen's map and published it as the landmark Archaeological Atlas of Ohio, the first comprehensive state archaeological survey produced in the United States. Despite her contribution, Allen was not credited in the final publication.

Allen was then hired as an Assistant Librarian at Ohio State, a post she held until 1901. During this time she earned a master's degree in library science.

== Later career ==
In 1901, Allen left Ohio State to study under historian Albert Bushnell Hart of Harvard University, but she did not complete her PhD. In the same year she married George Smart, the co-founder and editor of the Columbus Citizen. Whilst married she wrote the History of Forest Hills from the Days of Indians, which was published in 1924.

After her husband's death in 1925, Allen became the assistant to the headmaster and librarian at Kew-Forest School in Forest Hills, New York, and was appointed the Dean of Girls in 1947.

In 1937, she was appointed to the board of trustees of the Queensborough Public Library, becoming the first female on a citywide library board. She also served as the editor of The Forest Hills Gardens Bulletin, and was known for her living history performances, portraying American women such as Dolley Madison and Harriet Beecher Stowe.
