= William Corless Mills =

American museum curator

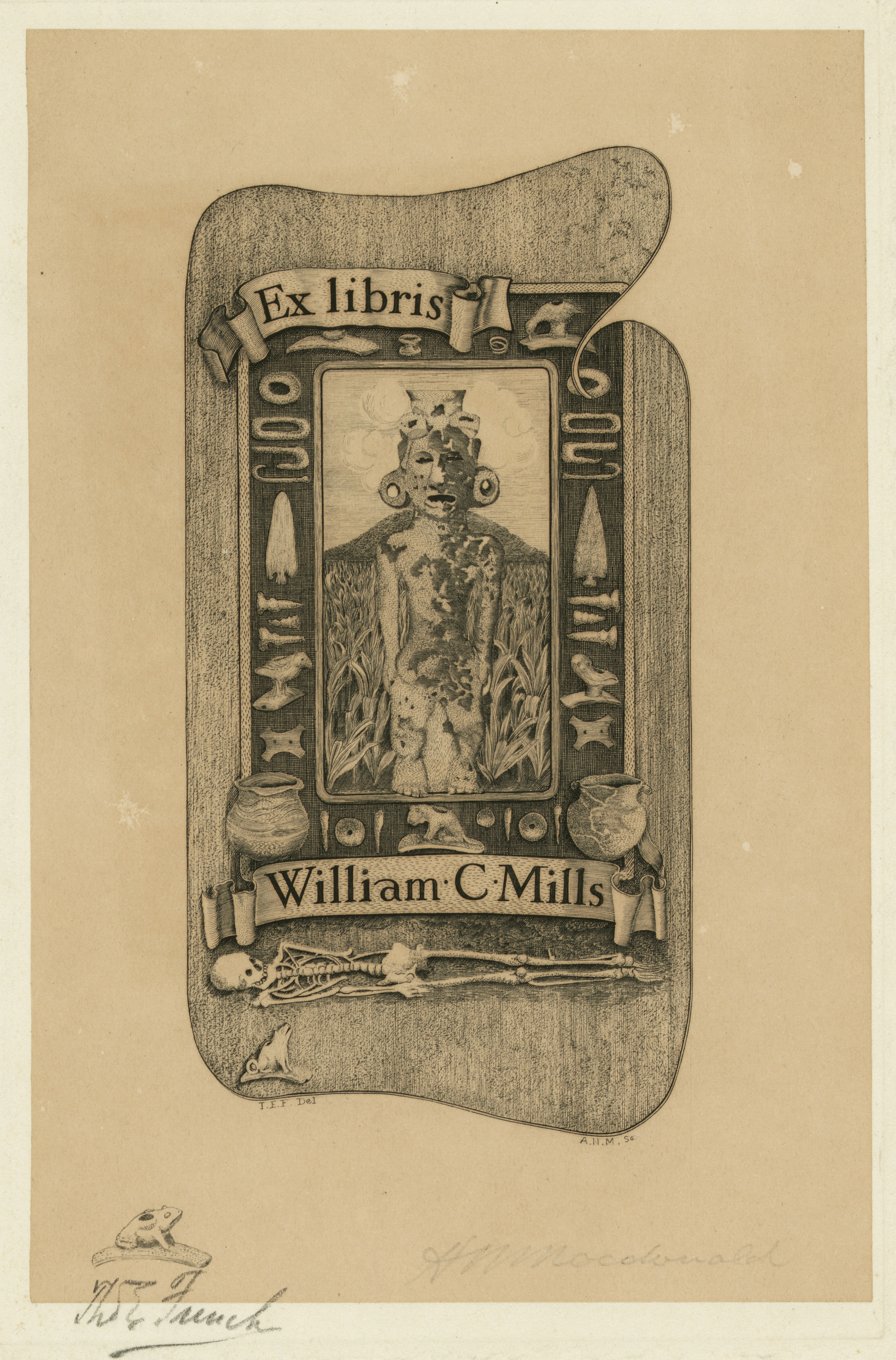
- Bookplate of William Corless Mills, showing archaeological artifacts and a skeleton
- Born: January 2, 1860; Pyrmont, Ohio, U.S.
- Died: January 17, 1928 (aged 68)
- Scientific career
- Fields: Native American

William Corless Mills (January 2, 1860 - January 17, 1928) was an American museum curator.

Mills was born in Pyrmont, Ohio.

Mills specialized in Native American remains, leading excavations in Adena mound, Ohio (1901)

Mills was the fourth curator and librarian of the Ohio State Archaeological and Historical Society (1898–1928), following Lucy Allen Smart. He also was

- member of the American Ornithological Union
- member and librarian of the Ohio Academy of Science
- member and president of the Wheaton Ornithological Society
- member and treasurer of the Columbus Horticultural Society
- charter member of the American Association of Museums (now the American Alliance of Museums)
- member of the Columbus Iris Society
- member of the National Research Council of Archaeology
- fellow of the American Ethnological Society
- fellow of the American Association for the Advancement of Science
- fellow of the American Anthropological Society
- assistant editor of the Ohio Naturalist
- lecturer in Sociology in the College of Commerce and Administration of the Ohio State University

Mills died in Columbus, Ohio.

== Works ==
- Excavation of the Adena Mound (1902)
