= Miamisburg Mound =

Archaeological site in Ohio, United States

- U.S. National Register of Historic Places
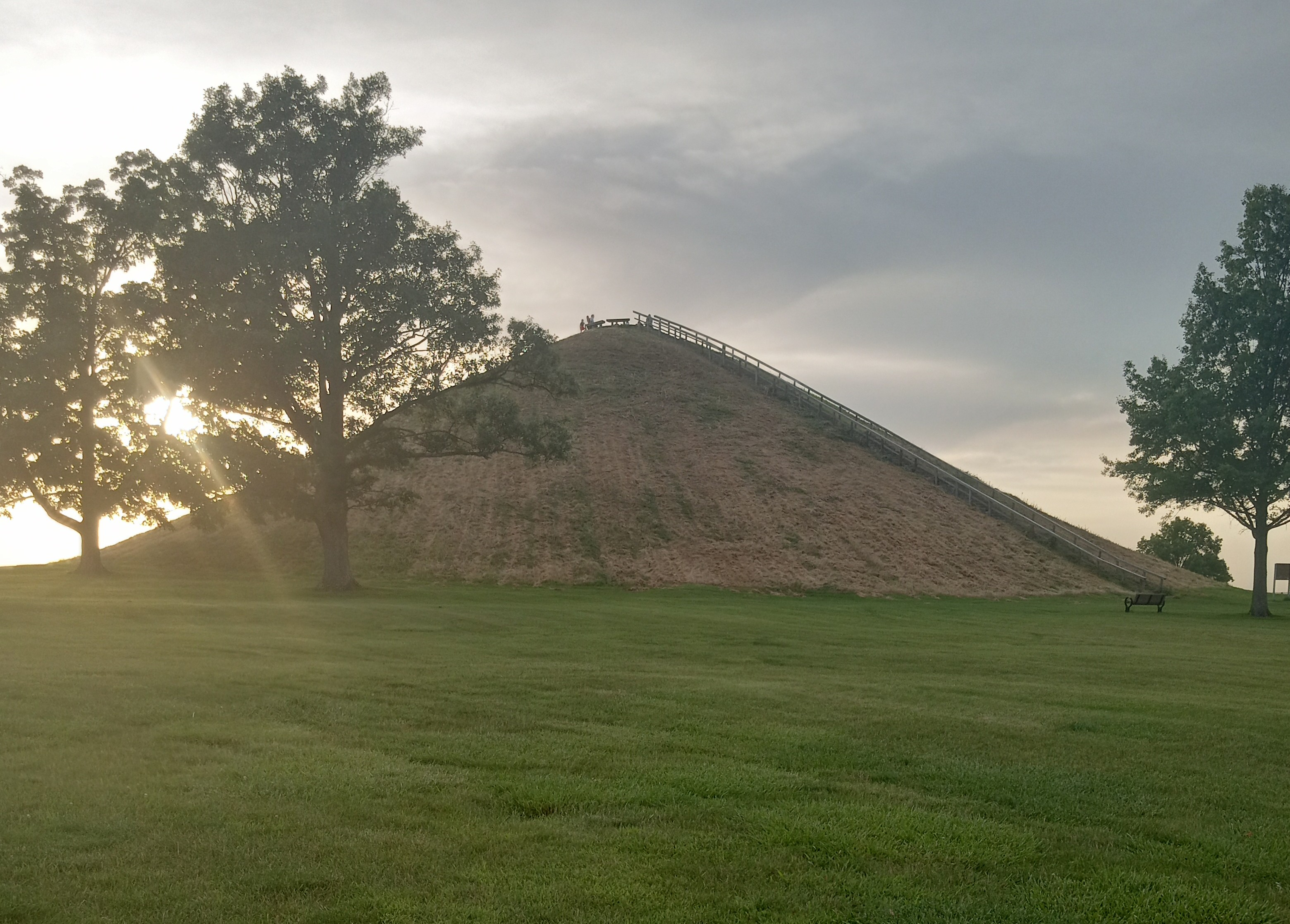
- The mound in 2024

- Location within Ohio Location within the United States
- Nearest city: Middletown, Ohio
- Coordinates: 39°37′39.36″N 84°16′51.2256″W
- Area: 1 acre (0.40 ha)
- Built: 800BC-100AD
- NRHP reference No.: 70000511
- Added to NRHP: November 10, 1971

Miamisburg Mound is a conical Native American Mound in Miamisburg, Ohio. At 65 feet (20 m) tall and 800 feet (240 m) in circumference, it is the largest burial mound in the Eastern United States. Built atop a hill overlooking the Miami River, it is believed to have been built by the Adena Culture between 800BC and 100AD. An excavation in 1869 unearthed several skeletons surrounded by clay and charcoal and a collection of ceremonial goods, including pipes and animal effigies. Charles F. Kettering bought the mound and turned it into a park in 1920. It was turned over to the Ohio History Connection for preservation in 1929. The site is managed locally by the city of Miamisburg. Stairs have been built allowing access to the top of the mound and providing impressive views of the Dayton area. Mound Laboratories, originally part of the Manhattan Project, is located across the street and was named for the Miamisburg Mound.
