= Story Mound State Memorial =

- U.S. National Register of Historic Places
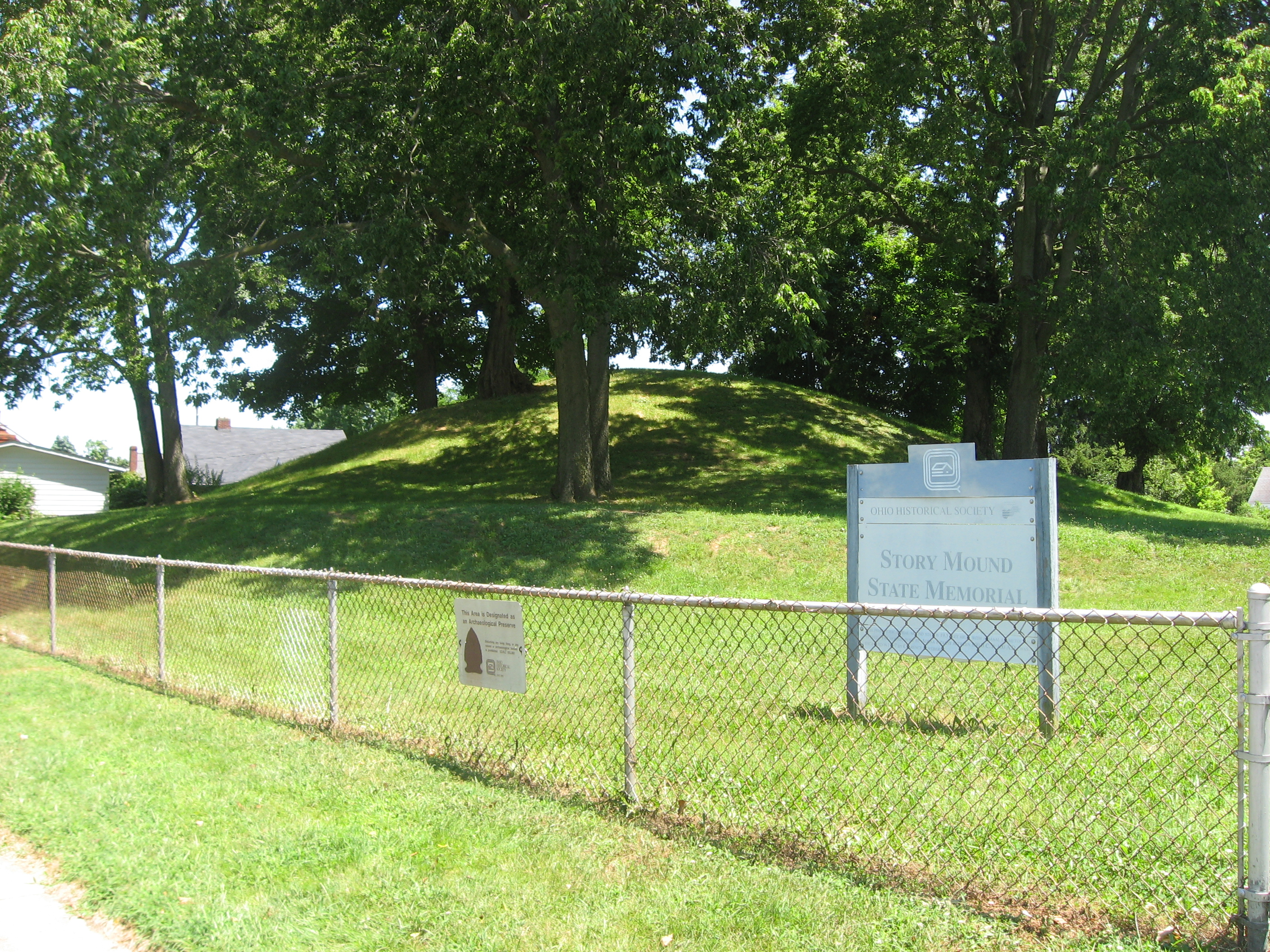

- Location within Ohio Location within the United States
- Location: East of junction of Cherokee and Delano Streets, Chillicothe, Ohio
- Coordinates: 39°20′31″N 82°59′58″W
- Area: 0.8 acres (0.32 ha)
- NRHP reference No.: 73001529
- Added to NRHP: March 7, 1973

Story Mound State Memorial is a Native American burial mound located in a residential area of Chillicothe, Ohio. The mound is conical with a diameter of 95 feet (29 m) and a height of 19.5 feet (5.9 m). It was built by the Adena culture, a mound-building group that lived in Ohio between approximately 800 B.C. and 100 A.D. The interior of the mound featured a circular wooden building, as was typical of Adena ceremonial mounds; as of the mound's excavation in 1897, the only remains of this building were bark fragments and a circular pattern of post holes. The excavation, conducted by archaeologist Clarence Loverberry, also unearthed a skeleton surrounded by jewelry, beads, and projectile points.

The mound was donated to the state of Ohio in 1950, and it is managed as a state memorial by the Ohio History Connection. The site was added to the National Register of Historic Places on March 7, 1973.
