= All-Ohio State Fair Band =

The All-Ohio State Fair Band (AOSFB) was established in 1925 and was first directed by Jack Wainwright of Fostoria. Each year, over 200 Ohio high-school musicians come to the Ohio State Fair for two weeks and perform multiple shows on the fair daily. These performances include concerts at various fair landmarks, such as the Natural Resources Park and Kasich Hall, marching in the daily parade, and participating in special fair events, such as the Opening Ceremony. The band also occasionally performs outside the fairgrounds, annually at the Columbus Park of Roses, and biennially at the Ohio Statehouse. The band is closely tied with the All Ohio State Fair Youth Choir, the two groups perform in a number of joint concerts during the fair. The band concludes every concert with John Philip Sousa's The Stars and Stripes Forever, a tradition dating back to the band's first performance. The current director of the band is Brian Dodd. The All-Ohio State Fair Band is the only state fair band in the United States.

== See also ==
- Ohio State Fair
- All-Ohio State Fair Youth Choir
