= Cedar Bog =

State Nature Preserve in Champaign County, Ohio

Cedar Bog Nature Preserve
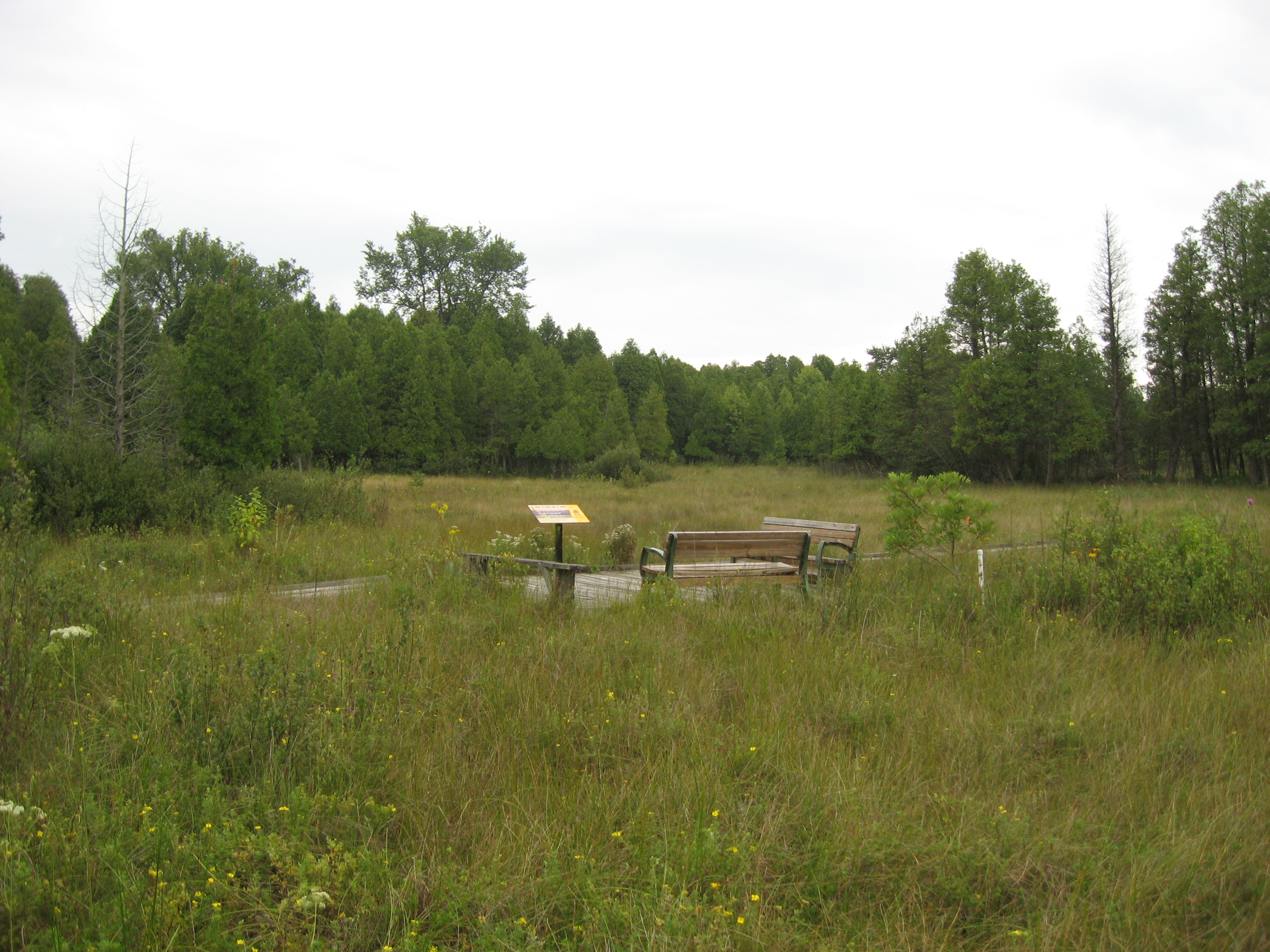
- Boardwalk crossing Cedar Bog

- Location within Ohio Location within the United States
- Location: Champaign County, Ohio
- Nearest city: Urbana
- Coordinates: 40°03′34″N 83°47′44″W
- Area: 450 acres (180 ha)
- Established: 1942
- Website: www.cedarbognp.org

U.S. National Natural Landmark
- Designated: 1967

Cedar Bog State Nature Preserve is a fen left behind by the retreating glaciers of the Wisconsin glaciation about 12,000-18,000 years ago. A protected area of about 450 acres (180 ha) of fen remains from the original area of approximately 7,000 acres (28 km^{2}).

Cedar Bog is located in Champaign County, Ohio, United States, near the city of Urbana. Groundwater from the Mad River Valley and the Urbana Outwash percolate through hundreds of feet of gravel left behind by the glacier in the Teays River. The Teays River is an underground river that existed before the Wisconsin glacier which, before the glacier, rivaled the Ohio River in size.

In addition to the water that feeds the bog, the glacier also left behind plants that are unique to Cedar Bog. Many of these plants are rare or endangered. The sedges and other plants that grow here left behind by the last glacier were the food for mastodons and giant sloths that once roamed the earth. Also, trees found here like bog birch and northern white cedar are more commonly found in the more northern boreal forest. Cedar Bog is also the home of the endangered spotted turtle, massasauga rattlesnake, and Milbert's tortoise-shell butterfly.

Cedar Bog was purchased in 1942 by the State of Ohio using public funds for the purpose of setting it aside as a natural area. The land was turned over to the Ohio History Connection for management. Cedar Bog was designated as a National Natural Landmark by the National Park Service in 1967. The preserve was first dedicated as a state nature preserve in 1979 and has been amended several times since.
