= Ohio History Connection =

Nonprofit cultural heritage organization in Ohio, US

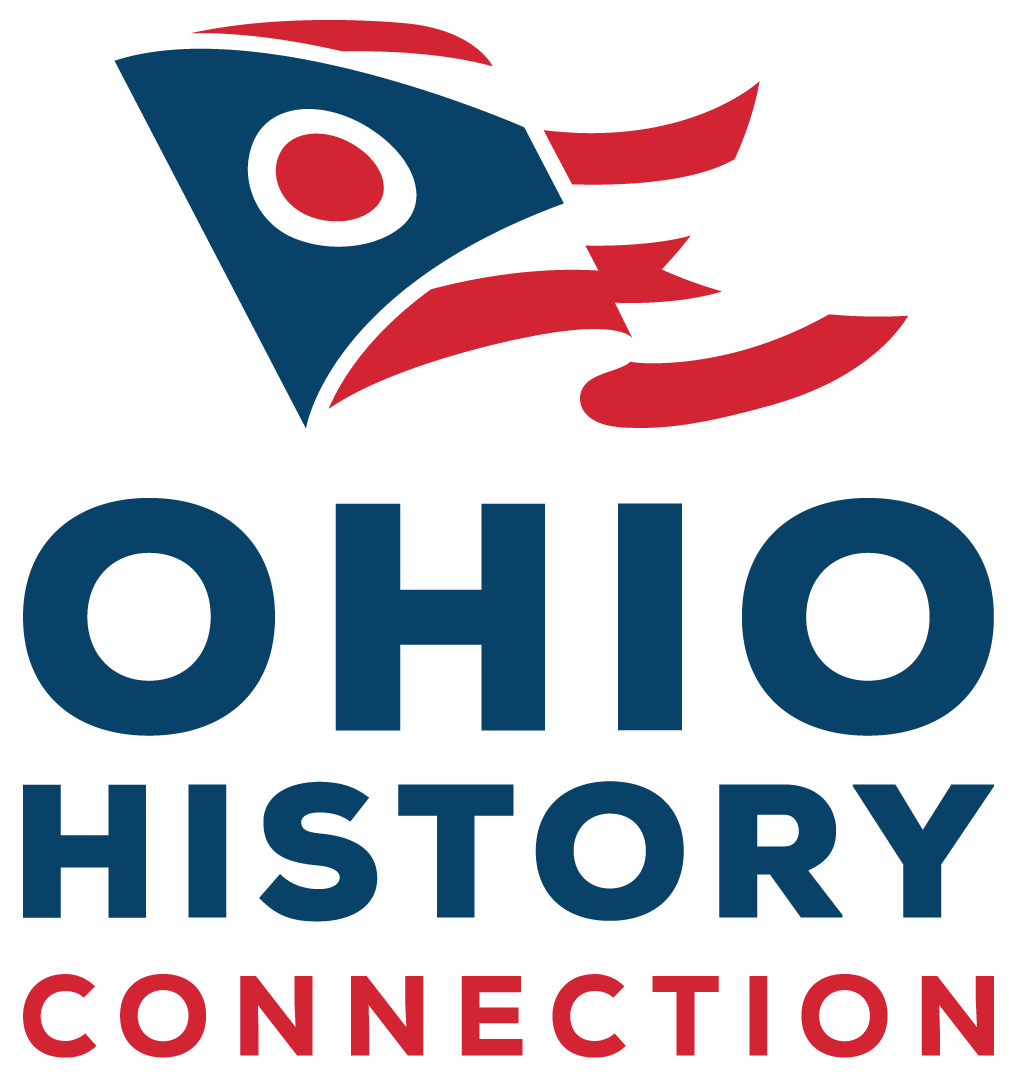

- Location within Ohio
- Established: 13 March 1885
- Type: Nonprofit
- Coordinates: 40.0049°N 82.9875°W
- Website: www.ohiohistory.org

Ohio History Connection, formerly The Ohio State Archaeological and Historical Society and Ohio Historical Society, is an American nonprofit organization incorporated in 1885. Headquartered at the Ohio History Center in Columbus, Ohio, Ohio History Connection provides services to both preserve and share Ohio's history, including its prehistory, and manages over 50 museums and sites across the state. An early iteration of the organization was founded by Brigadier General Roeliff Brinkerhoff in 1875. Over its history, the organization changed its name twice, with the first occurring in 1954 when the name was shortened to Ohio Historical Society. In 2014, it was changed again to Ohio History Connection, in what members believed was a more modern and welcoming representation of the organization's image.

== History ==
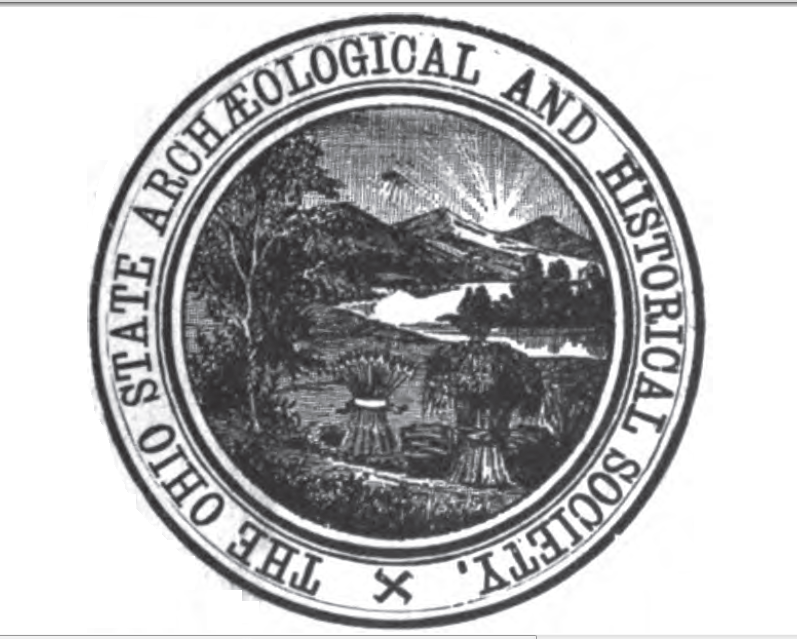
1898 seal of The Ohio State Archaeological and Historical Society

In its early history, Ohioans made several attempts to establish a formal historical society. On February 1, 1822, the Ohio General Assembly passed legislation creating the Historical Society of Ohio. Well-known Ohio political leaders at the time, Jeremiah Morrow and Duncan McArthur, were members. The society's formation was brief, however, as it held only one meeting. The state legislature made another attempt in 1831, when it authorized Benjamin Tappan to form its replacement. He established the Historical and Philosophical Society of Ohio, which met regularly in Columbus. Participation declined sharply following the Panic of 1837, and the organization decided to move to Cincinnati in 1848 in hopes that the city's larger population would help revive interest. The decision led to a period of prosperity for the organization, and it worked closely with the Cincinnati Historical Society for many years.

In 1875, a new organization called the Archaeological Society was founded in the home of Brigadier General Roeliff Brinkerhoff in Mansfield, Ohio. The Ohio state legislature had procured $2,500 in funds, at the request of General Brinkerhoff, to finance the creation of an exhibit for the upcoming Centennial International Exhibition of 1876 in Philadelphia. The society was active until 1883 when its secretary, Professor John T. Short of the Ohio State University, died. It was revived two years later at the request of Governor George Hoadly, who organized two meetings in the state's capital with scholars and professors from around the state. Sixty men attended the second meeting which had sessions spanning two days. On March 13, 1885, the Ohio State Archaeological and Historical Society was officially incorporated. Allen G. Thurman was elected its first president.

The state government began appropriating funds to assist the private organization in 1888. This led to a closer partnership with the state, in which the government was permitted to appoint six of the fifteen members serving in the board of trustees. It also led to the organization being granted oversight responsibilities for historical sites across Ohio, beginning with Fort Ancient State Memorial in 1891.

In 1954, the organization's name was shortened to Ohio Historical Society. It was changed again to the Ohio History Connection in 2014, after research suggested that "society" carried a negative connotation. The organization's image as a whole was perceived as "exclusive, inaccessible and antiquated", and the rebranding was an attempt to better reflect the organization's mission from a modern perspective and appeal more inviting to the state's citizens. The change was also part of a national trend that saw historical societies across the United States drop "society" from their title.

The organization began reaching out to federally recognized tribal nations in 2009, in an effort to incorporate Native American perspectives. The Ohio History Connection holds more than 7,100 Native American remains that are subject to the Native American Graves Protection and Repatriation Act, which was passed in 1990. The organization reaches out to the 45 federally recognized American Indian Tribes who are descendants of the parties who signed the Treaty of Greenville (Aug. 3, 1795), as outlined in its American Indian Relations Policy. This list is expanded based on Tribal interests and affiliations, and as new claims and research are made available. The Ohio History Connection has been actively working since 2016 to reconnect Ancestors with federally recognized Tribes. As of January 2025, ProPublica reports Ohio History Connection has the largest collection of unrepatriated Native American remains in the United States. It has made 2% of the human remains available to tribes.

As of November 2025, the Ohio History Connection manages more than 50 museums and historical sites across Ohio, spanning 40 of the state's 88 counties. This includes approximately 2 million artifacts, over 700,000 archival materials, and 250,000 images. Membership of the nonprofit organization is approximately 7,500.

== Ohio Memory ==
Ohio Memory is a "Collaborative Program of the Ohio History Connection and the State Library of Ohio.

== Ohio History Center ==
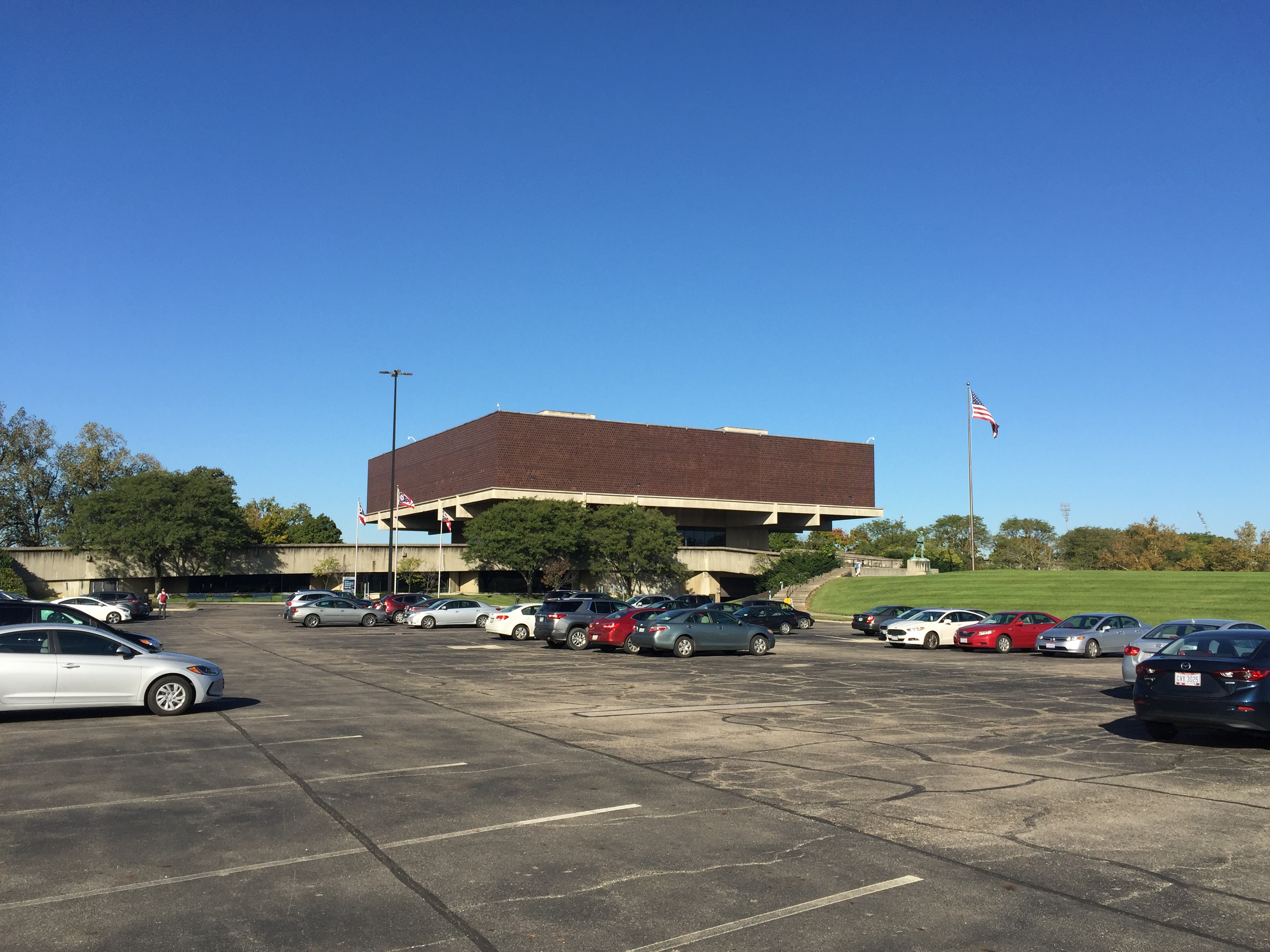
The Ohio History Center in Columbus, Ohio

The Ohio State Archaeological and Historical Society was originally headquartered at the Ohio Statehouse but later moved to Ohio State University's Orton Hall in 1894. On May 30, 1914, the organization dedicated the Ohio State Archaeological and Historical Society Building, a large museum building by Orton Hall. The society stayed at the building until 1970, when the facility became part of OSU and was renamed Sullivant Hall. The archives moved to the Old Governor's Mansion on Broad Street. In 1965, voters approved a bond for a new structure to be built at 800 E. 17th Avenue, next to the Ohio State Fairgrounds. W. Byron Ireland designed a Brutalist building with post-tensioned concrete structures, allowing for a cantilevered design. The building remains mostly as built, including its exterior use of silo tiles made in Ohio. This building is the Ohio History Center, the current headquarters of Ohio History Connection.

The 250,000-square-foot (23,000 m^{2}) Ohio History Center in Columbus, Ohio, houses extensive exhibits covering Ohio's history from the Ice Age to the present. The Center includes state archives and library spaces, a gift shop, and administrative and educational facilities. The 1989 Smithsonian Guide to Historic America described the center as "probably the finest museum in America devoted to pre-European history."

== Ohio Village ==
Ohio Village is temporarily closed and undergoing renovations. It is set to reopen in July of 2026.

Constructed as an 1890s-era town, Ohio Village, is the living museum area of the Ohio History Center campus. In 2002, budget cuts forced the Ohio Village to close except for special events, school and tour groups. In the summer of 2012, it reopened to the public, relying on volunteers instead of paid staffing, who purchase their own costumes and dedicate at least 16 hours of work per season. The Ohio Village attempts to "animate history" in the sense of taking what is perceived as one-dimensional and converting it into three dimensions, with the volunteers portraying characters that represent people who truly existed during the mid-to-late 19th century. It is open to the public from Memorial Day weekend through Labor Day weekend and for special events such as All Hallows Eve and Dickens of a Christmas.

The village hosts home games for the Ohio Village Muffins, a vintage base ball club formed in 1981 that competes against other vintage teams from Ohio and around the country. The team's name is derived from the phrase muff, a term often used during the era to refer to an "error". A team's third string was typically labeled the "muffin nine". The Ohio Village Muffins promote the preservation of the game as it was played in 1860, using underhanded pitching, foregoing the use of gloves, and wearing uniforms that match the time period. Ohio Village also hosts a women's team called The Diamonds. A league for women, as teams formed at colleges across the country, began in 1866.

== Ohio History Connection resources ==
The Ohio History Connection also provides educators with resources for the state's schools. Field trips, outreach programs, and 'Museum in a Box' kits are available to assist teachers with supplemental learning in their classrooms. Also offered are distance learning courses. Ohio History Connection also provides public programs that include speakers, theatrical productions, conferences, workshops, holiday gatherings, and presentations. The topics of these programs range from the Underground Railroad to the role of the state in historical events.

== Sites by region ==
The Ohio History Connection operates a statewide network of historical, archaeological and natural history sites. Admission is free for members. In some cases, the Ohio History Connection has contracted with other organizations for management.

=== Northeast ===
- Custer Monument, New Rumley
- Fort Laurens, Bolivar
- McCook House, Carrollton
- Museum of Ceramics, East Liverpool
- National Road & Zane Grey Museum, Norwich
- Quaker Yearly Meeting House, Mount Pleasant
- Schoenbrunn Village, New Philadelphia
- Shaker Historical Museum, Shaker Heights
- Tallmadge Church, Tallmadge
- Youngstown Historical Center, Youngstown
- Zoar Village, Zoar

=== Northwest ===
- Armstrong Air and Space Museum, Wapakoneta
- Cedar Bog, Urbana
- Cooke-Dorn House, Sandusky
- Fallen Timbers, Toledo
- Fort Amanda, Lima
- Fort Jefferson Memorial Park, Greenville
- Fort Meigs, Perrysburg
- Fort Recovery Museum & Monument, Fort Recovery
- Indian Mill, Upper Sandusky
- Inscription Rock, Kelleys Island
- Johnston Farm and Indian Agency, Piqua
- Lockington Locks, Lockington
- Rutherford B. Hayes Presidential Library & Museums, Fremont

=== Central ===
- Flint Ridge Ancient Quarries & Nature Preserve, Glenford
- Hanby House, Westerville
- Logan Elm, Circleville
- Newark Earthworks: Great Circle Earthworks, Newark
- Newark Earthworks: Octagon Earthworks, Newark
- Newark Earthworks: Wright Earthworks, Newark
- Ohio History Center, Columbus
- Ohio Village, Columbus
- Shrum Mound, Columbus
- Wahkeena Nature Preserve, Sugar Grove, Ohio
- Warren G. Harding Home, Marion
- Warren G. Harding Tomb, Marion

=== Southwest ===
- Adena Mansion & Gardens, Chillicothe
- Fort Ancient Earthworks & Nature Preserve, Oregonia
- Fort Hill Earthworks & Nature Preserve, Hillsboro
- Harriet Beecher Stowe House, Cincinnati
- John Rankin House, Ripley
- Miamisburg Mound, Miamisburg
- National Afro-American Museum & Cultural Center, Wilberforce
- Paul Laurence Dunbar House, Dayton
- Serpent Mound, Peebles
- Story Mound, Chillicothe
- U.S. Grant Birthplace, Point Pleasant
- U.S. Grant Boyhood Home, Georgetown
- U.S. Grant Schoolhouse, Georgetown
- William Henry Harrison Tomb, North Bend

=== Southeast ===
- Big Bottom, Stockport
- Buckeye Furnace, Wellston
- Buffington Island, Portland
- Campus Martius, Marietta
- John and Annie Glenn Museum, New Concord
- Leo Petroglyph & Nature Preserve, Ray
- McCook House, Carrollton
- Ohio River Museum, Marietta
- Our House Tavern, Gallipolis

== See also ==
- History of Ohio
- Columbus Historical Society
- List of historical societies in Ohio
