= Emerson Greenman =

American archaeologist and scholar

- Born: September 10, 1895; Hartwellville, Michigan
- Died: June 24, 1973 (aged 77); Ann Arbor, Michigan
- Spouse: Edna Greenman (m. 1927)
- Children: 3

Academic background
- Education: University of Michigan (BA, 1923; PhD, 1927); Oxford University (dip, 1924)

Emerson Frank Greenman (born 1895–1973) was an American archaeologist and scholar.

== Early life and education ==
Greenman was born September 10, 1895, in Hartwellville, Michigan. He graduated from Owosso High School.

In 1916, he began studying engineering at the University of Michigan before joining the US Army in 1918. In 1920, Greenman returned to the University of Michigan, receiving a Bachelor of Arts in 1923. He received a diploma in anthropology Oxford University (1924) before studying briefly at the American School of Prehistoric Research in Europe, after which he returned to the University of Michigan to receive a Doctor of Philosophy in anthropology in 1927.

== Career ==
Greenman began his career working at the University of Michigan, where he was curator of the Great Lakes Divisions of the Museum of Anthropology.

From 1928 to 1935, Greenman served as curator of Archaeology for the Ohio State Archaeological and Historical Society.

Upon leaving Ohio State, he returned to the University of Michigan, where, in addition to his position as curator, he taught in the anthropology department. From 1938 to 1953, he led a field school in the Manitoulin District. In 1950, he became the Michigan Archaeological Society's first secretary-treasurer, and became the honorary secretary five years later. He was also the inaugural editor of Michigan Archaeologist, a position he held from 1953 to 1965. He retired in 1965.

== Personal life ==
In October 1927, Greenman married his wife Edna, with whom he had three children: Mary, Emerson, and Sarah.

He died on June 24, 1973 in Ann Arbor, Michigan.

== Selected publications ==
- The Younge Site: An Archaeological Record for Michigan (Museum of Anthropology Occasional Contribution no. 6, 1937)
- Guide to Serpent Mound (Ohio State Archaeological and Historical Society, 1939)
- The Indians of Michigan (Michigan Historical Commission, 1961)
