= Ohio Expo Center and State Fairgrounds =

Event venue in Columbus, Ohio

Coordinates: 39.998513°N 82.992348°W

- Ohio Expo Center and State Fairgrounds venue
- Interactive map of Ohio Expo Center and State Fairgrounds
- Address: 717 E. 17th Ave. Columbus, Ohio; United States
- Operator: Virgil L. Strickler
- Capacity: 20,000

Construction
- Opened: 1886

Website
- www.ohioexpocenter.com

The Ohio Expo Center and State Fairgrounds is an exhibition center and fairground site, located in Columbus, Ohio. The site has been home to the Ohio State Fair since 1886.

== Attributes ==
The fairgrounds site includes numerous fair buildings: the Bricker Building, Taft Coliseum, Celeste Center, Congress Pavilion, Cooper Arena, Cox Fine Arts Center, and others. Parks included in the site include Natural Resources Park, Central Park, and Heritage Park.

Nearby entities considered on the fairgrounds include the Ohio History Center, Historic Crew Stadium, and the Ohio State Highway Patrol Training Academy.

=== Celeste Center ===
Celeste Center is a 10,200-seat multipurpose arena. The building, named for former Ohio Governor and United States Ambassador to India Richard F. Celeste, is used for concerts, trade shows, banquets, and sporting events.

The arena contains 60,000 sq ft (5,600 m^{2}). of unobstructed floor space and two stages, one a 75-foot (23 m)-by-32-foot permanent stage and a portable stage measuring up to 60 feet (18 m) by 32 feet (9.8 m). It also features air conditioning, an excellent sound system, dressing rooms with showers, large rest rooms, office space and concession stands.

The Celeste Center is a rather low roofed arena for its capacity (53 feet tall). When used for concerts, the seating is set up amphitheater style.

In 2000, Christina Aguilera performed to a sold-out crowd as part of her first concert tour.

== See also ==
- All American Quarter Horse Congress
- List of contemporary amphitheatres
