= Ohio State Fair =

Annual state fair

Coordinates: 40°00′00″N 82°59′35″W

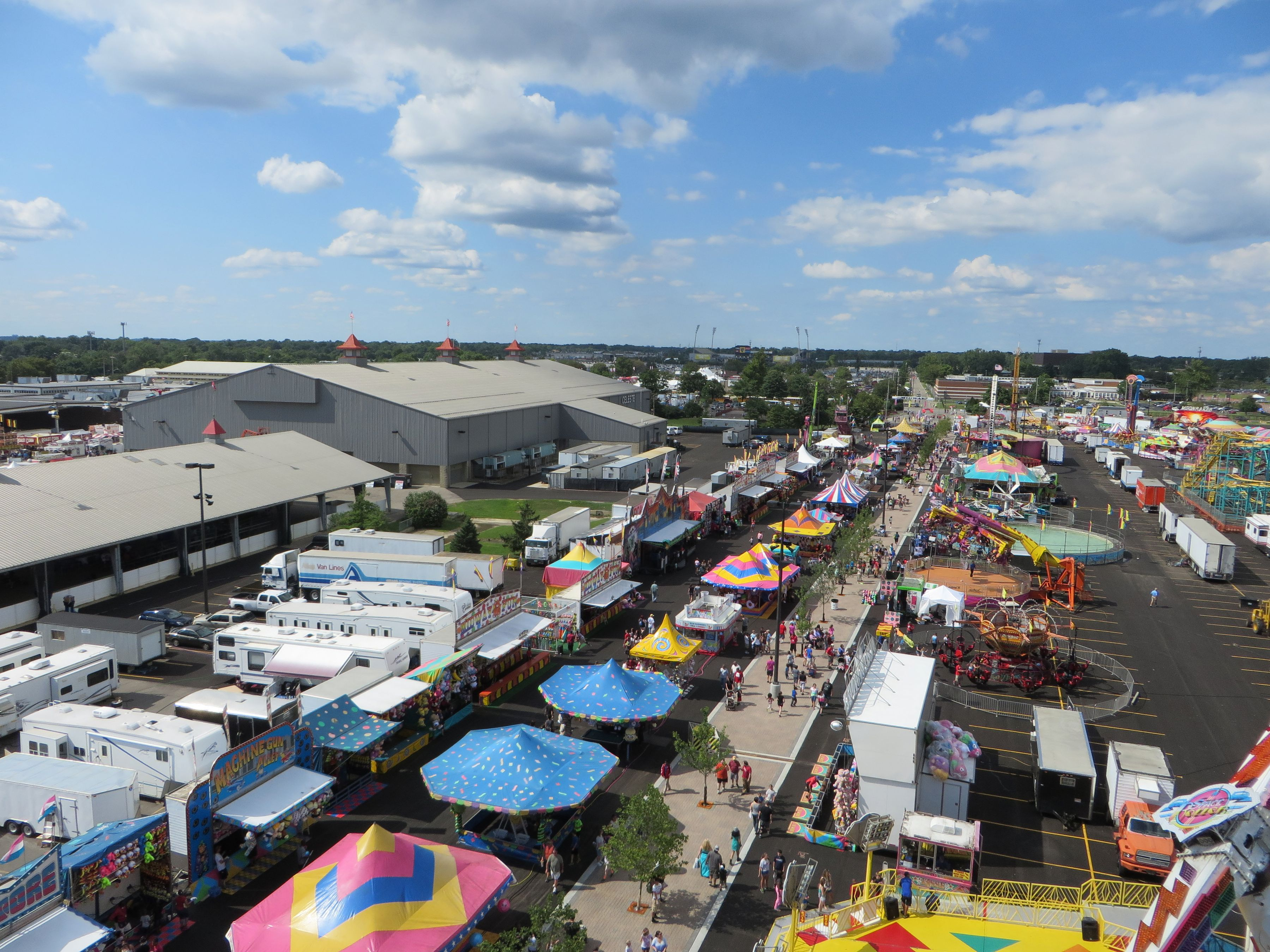
- Status: Active
- Genre: State fair
- Dates: Late July – early August
- Frequency: Annually
- Location: Ohio Expo Center and State Fairgrounds
- Country: United States
- Years active: 1850–1916; 1919–1941; 1946–2019; 2021–present
- Established: October 2, 1850
- Founder: Ohio Department of Agriculture
- Attendance: 1,006,228 (2023)
- Website: Ohio State Fair

The Ohio State Fair is one of the largest state fairs in the United States, held in Columbus, Ohio during late July through early August. As estimated in a 2011 economic impact study conducted by Saperstein & Associates; the State Fair contributes approximately 68.5 million dollars to the state's economy. In 2023, attendance was 1,006,228, the Fair's highest 12-day attendance on record.

From the first three-day Fair in 1850 in Cincinnati to the 12-day exposition of today (from 1981 to 2003, the Fair lasted 17 days), the Ohio State Fair has celebrated Ohio's products, its people, and their accomplishments. The Fair's vast programme offers concerts, sports competitions, exhibitions, a horse show, rides, and food stalls. The concert series lineup is usually announced in late February or early March. The fair has been held at the Ohio Expo Center and State Fairgrounds since 1886.

Patrollers include security guards, the Columbus Division of Police, Franklin County Sheriff's Office, and the Ohio State Highway Patrol.

== History ==
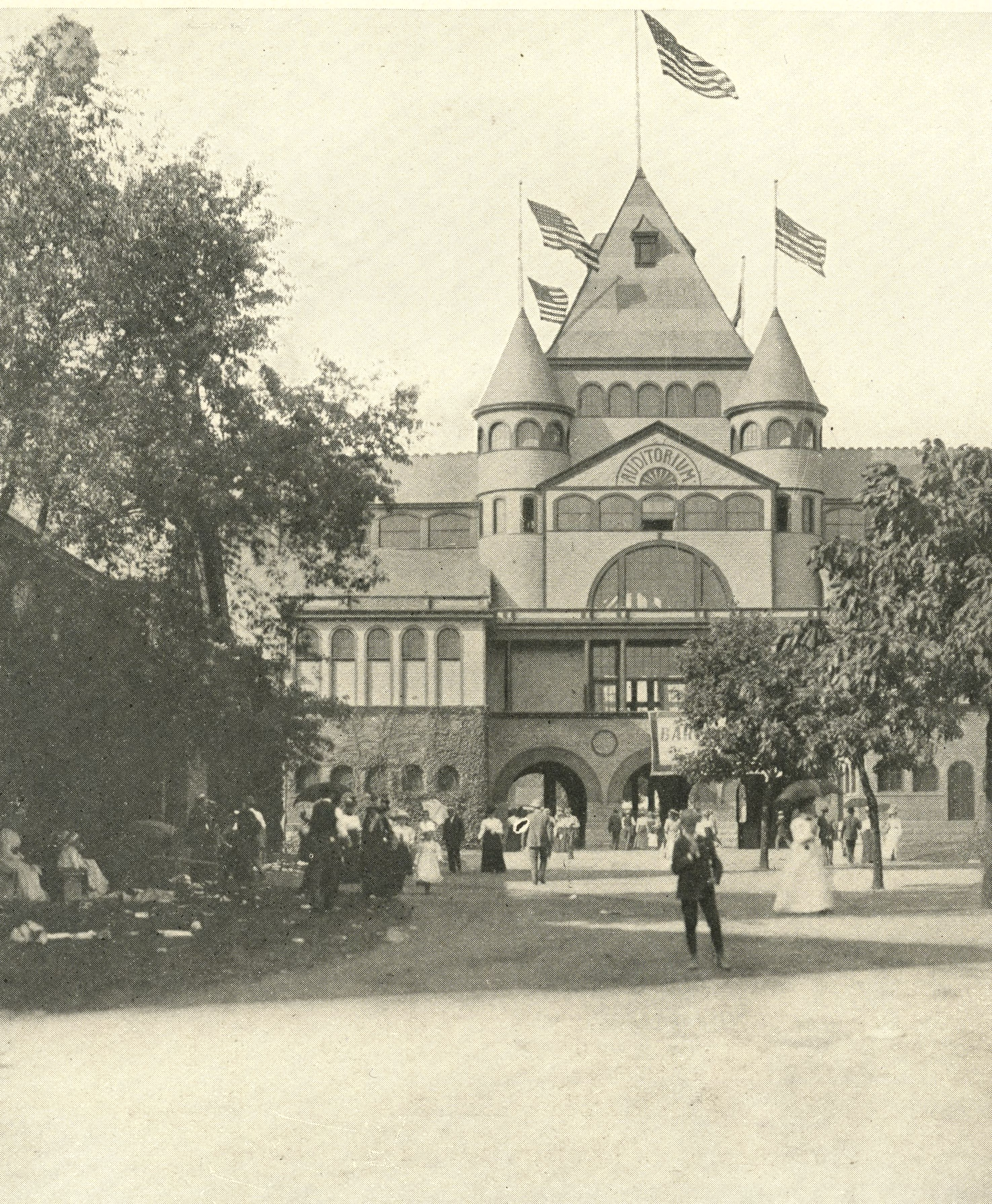
Main exhibition building, 1901

| Year | Location |
|---|---|
| 1850 | Cincinnati (Camp Washington) |
| 1851 | Columbus (Franklinton) |
| 1852 | Cleveland |
| 1853 | Dayton |
| 1854 | Newark |
| 1855 | Columbus (Franklinton) |
| 1856 | Cleveland |
| 1857 | Cincinnati |
| 1858 | Sandusky |
| 1859 | Zanesville |
| 1860-61 | Dayton |
| 1862-63 | Cleveland |
| 1864-65 | Columbus (site of Schiller Park) |
| 1866-67 | Dayton |
| 1868-69 | Toledo |
| 1870-71 | Springfield |
| 1872-73 | Mansfield |
| 1874-1885 | Columbus (site of Franklin Park) |
| 1886–present | Columbus (State Fairgrounds) |

In 1846, the Ohio General Assembly created the 53-member Ohio State Board of Agriculture. One of the Board's first acts was to establish a District Fair. The resulting 1847 District Fair at Wilmington, Ohio and the 1848 District Fair at Xenia, Ohio were both successful, leading to the planning of a State Fair.

The first Ohio State Fair was planned for September 1849, but an outbreak of Asiatic cholera forced cancellation of those plans. The following year, autumn dates were chosen to lessen the risk of cholera. Even so, the superintendent of grounds, Darius Lapham, died of the disease just a few weeks before the opening date.

Camp Washington, Cincinnati (two miles north of downtown Cincinnati, Ohio) was the site for the first Ohio State Fair, October 2–4, 1850. The site was described as 8–10 acres with grassy slopes, shade trees, and numerous tents. The grounds were enclosed by a 10-foot (3.0 m)-high board fence. Cattle were tethered to a railing along the carriage road.

The railroads offered strong support to the early State Fairs. Special rates were offered whereby exhibits were transported without charge, and the exhibitor rode for half fare. Several Central Ohioans contributed to the support of the first Fair, including Alfred Kelley, owner of the Columbus and Xenia Railroad.

Cash premiums at the first Fair did not exceed $20, with the exception of an award of $50 given to essayists on the topic "Improving the Soil." During the early State Fairs, winners received medals, not ribbons, as awards. In 1850, the silver medal was valued at $3.

The public was admitted only on the second and third day of the first Fair. Day one was devoted to setting up and judging. Admission was twenty cents, but exhibitors could buy a $1 badge for admission of their families. A visitor could also buy a $1 badge, which admitted one gentleman and two ladies. The two-day attendance was estimated at 25,000 to 30,000 people.

Transportation around Ohio was difficult. Therefore, the majority of exhibitors came from close proximity to the Fair. Officials reasoned that moving the Fair thought to increase interest and attendance.

From 1874 until 1885, the site of Columbus' Franklin Park served as home to the Ohio State Fair. Finally, in 1886, the Fair moved to its current location to what is currently called the Ohio Expo Center and State Fairgrounds. The main entrance to the site was at the southwest corner of the grounds along Woodard Avenue. It is now along 11th Avenue.

=== 2017 ride accident ===
On July 26, 2017, the opening day of the 2017 Fair, a swinging ride known as Fire Ball broke apart mid-swing, flinging passengers out of the ride. One rider, 18-year-old Tyler Jarrell, was flung 50 feet (15 m) and killed on impact. Seven other riders were seriously injured, two of whom were reported to be in critical condition. The ride had been inspected earlier in the day and cleared for operation. The Ohio Department of Agriculture and Ohio State Highway Patrol investigated the incident and the Fair announced that it would not operate any rides on July 27 until they are all re-inspected by state authorities. Then-governor John Kasich considered it to be the "worst tragedy" in the Fair's history.

In response to the incident, the ride's manufacturer, KMG, as well as Chance Morgan—which produces a similar ride, requested that other rides of the same type be shut down pending an investigation into the failure. Preliminary findings by KMG found that the failure was caused by "excessive corrosion on the interior of the gondola support beam" over the life of the 18 year-old unit.

== Milestones ==
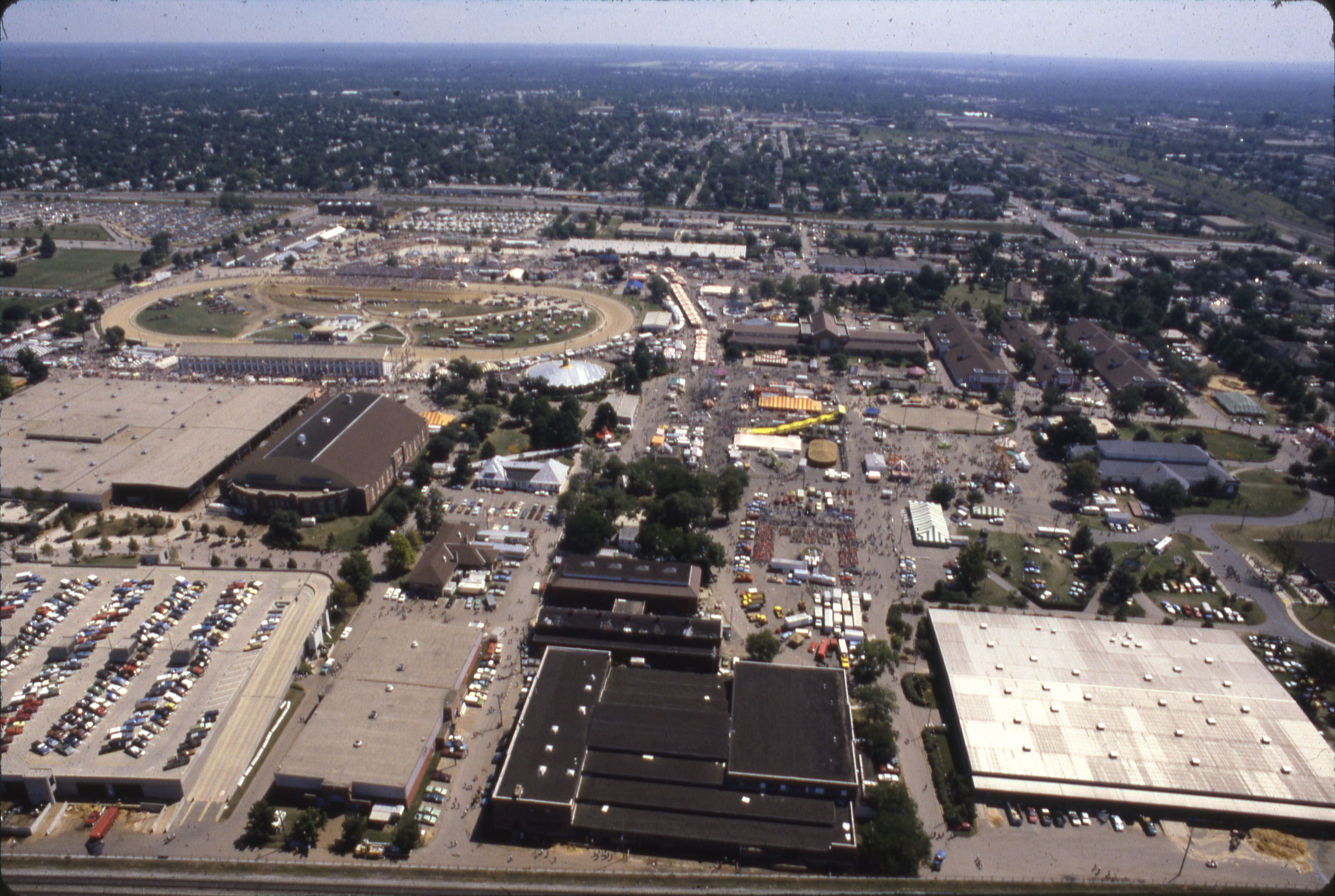
Aerial view of the fair and fairgrounds, c. 1980

1853 – Entertainment crept into the Fair programming with the first pony rides for children and monkeys dressed in hats that danced to minstrel tunes.

1860 – Fair premiums rose to $200 (up from $20 in 1850).

1884 – In July, prior to the Fair's opening, a racing mare kicked over a lantern, resulting in 100 stalls being burned. Loss to buildings was set at $1,100. The dead mare was valued at $5,000.

1886 – The current Ohio State Fair site was dedicated on Tuesday, August 31 during the 37th Ohio State Fair. Governor Foraker accepted the grounds in front of a crowd of 6,000.

1890s – At least 16 railroad companies served Columbus and the Fair.

1894 – A college football tournament was held this year, with Denison University, Miami University, Wittenberg University, Buchtel and Ohio State University participating.

1896 – The Ohio State Fair became the first fair with an electric lighting system. This made it possible to offer night-time racing. Also this year, horseless vehicles made their first appearance at the Ohio State Fair.

1903 – The first Butter Cow and Calf were featured at the Fair this year. They were made by A.T. Shelton & Company, distributors of Sunbury Creamery Butter. Additional sculptures were added in the 1960s, the subjects of which change every year.

1916 – On the eve of World War I, the largest American flag, measuring 136 ft × 65 ft (41 m × 20 m), was displayed at the 11th Avenue entrance.

1919 – After World War I the fair resumes.

1922 – Just days before the scheduled opening of the Fair, fire raced across the grounds. Six buildings were destroyed including the central group, the Horticulture Building and the East and West Buildings. Loss was estimated at more than $800,000.

1924 – Earliest records of the Ohio State Fair Queen contest date back to this year.

1925 – The Diamond Jubilee Spectacle this year saluted the 75th anniversary of the Fair. More than 2,000 participants enacted the evolution of the Fair in three, 25-year periods on three stages and with fireworks.

1925 – The All-Ohio Boys Band was first mentioned in historical accounts this year. It is now called the All-Ohio State Fair Band and includes both boys and girls.

1928 – The renowned John Philip Sousa Band performed twice daily at the 1928 Fair.

1929 – The Junior Fair was formed this year. Today, Ohio is proud to host the nation's largest Junior Fair with more than 17,000 youth participating. In the same year, the Ohio State Fair Junior Fair Board was formed. The Junior Fair Board is made up of outstanding individuals from various youth organizations including 4-H, Future Farmers of America, Girl Scouts of the USA, Boy Scouts of America, Farm Bureau Youth, and others.

1941 – A sign of the times found 150 female Fair ticket takers were hired in place of men for the first time.

1942–45 – The Board of Agriculture canceled the Ohio State Fair and allowed the War Department to use the grounds and buildings for handling airplane parts and equipment. The Army Air Corps rented the facility for $1 per year. A similar fate befell fairs in Indiana, Illinois and Pennsylvania. When the Army vacated the fairgrounds, they left the grounds and buildings in a shambles.

1946 – The fair resumes after World War II.

1957 – The first female livestock judge appeared this year. Mrs. Maurice Neville judged the Yorkshire Swine Show.

1963 – The All-Ohio State Fair Youth Choir was established. It was directed by Glenville Thomas of Zanesville.

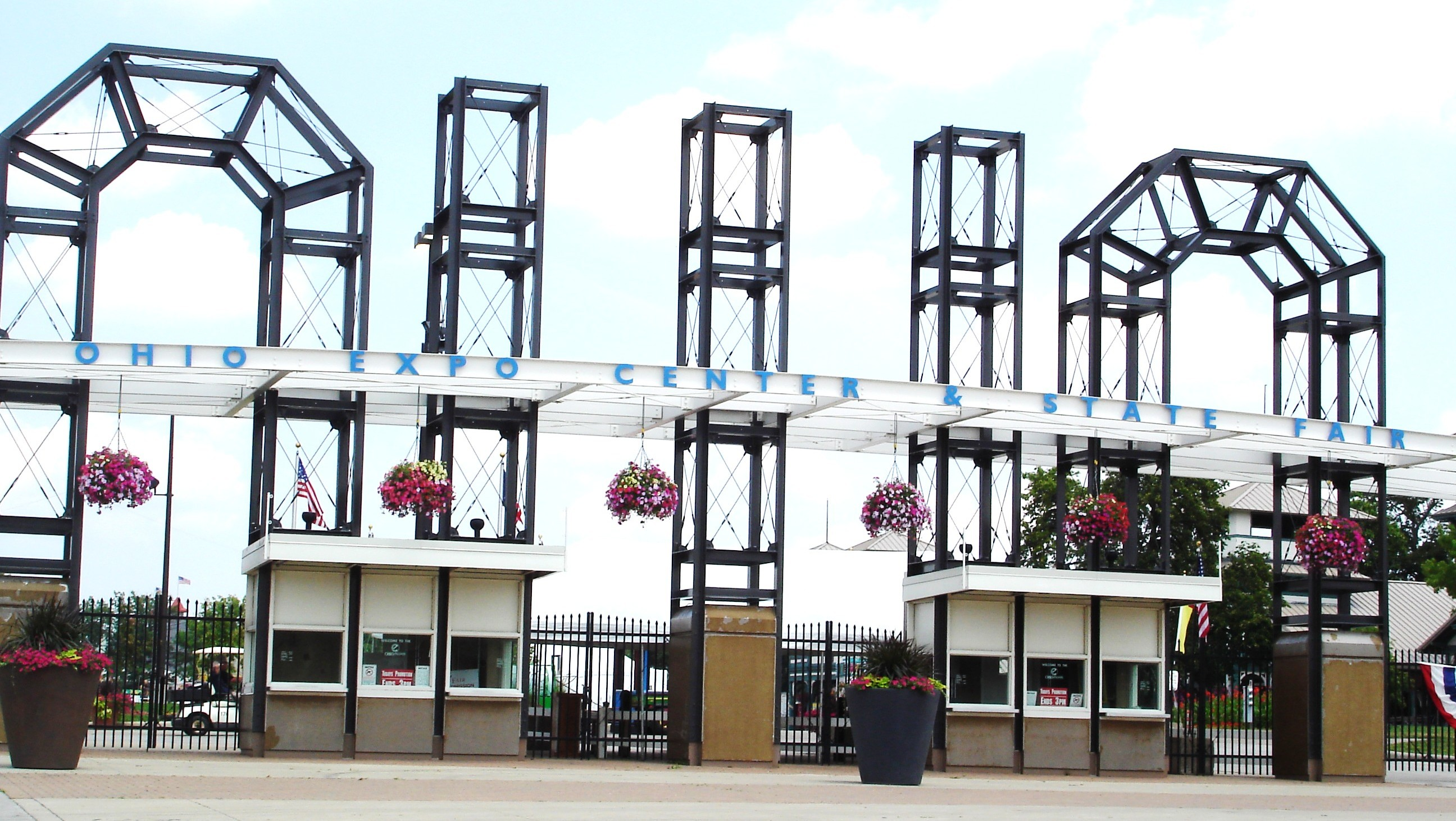
Entrance to the Ohio State Fair

1966 – At the 11th Avenue gate, the new OHIO entrance was built at a cost of $40,000.

1968 – The first Sale of Champions livestock auction was held with sales amounting to $22,674. The Bee Gees, Bob Hope, James Brown, Johnny Carson, and Sly and the Family Stone performed.

1969 – The first portion of the sky ride was built this year. It was extended to 11th Avenue in 1984. Bob Hope and Johnny Cash performed.

1972 – Fire struck the Ohio Expo Center in October during the American Dairy Show. Three connected barns were burned, killing three head of cattle and destroying virtually all the exhibitors' belongings. These buildings have since been replaced by the Gilligan Complex (1972 and 1978) and the O'Neill Swine Arena (1973). Bob Hope, Kenny Rogers, Mac Davis, Roberta Flack, The Osmonds, and Ike & Tina Turner performed.

1976 – In celebration of the United States Bicentennial, a time capsule was buried in the gardens near the 11th Avenue gate. It holds treasures of the times from the Ohio State Fair, Ohio sports teams, coins and stamps, a T-shirt, Levi's jeans and tennis shoes. It will be opened in 2026. Bob Hope, Mac Davis, the Osmonds, Pat Boone, Tanya Tucker, Johnny Cash perform.

1981 – The fair was stretched to 17 days, running from Friday, August 14 – Sunday, August 30. Entertainment was held at the outdoor grandstand on the infield of the race track. Two shows were performed usually at 3:30 and 7:30 pm. Entertainment was free and seating was on a first come, first served basis. Wooden folding chairs were available for seating on the race track. There was also a VIP section in front of the stage on the racetrack. Tickets were required to get into this section.

- 6 a.m. Opening day ceremony at the OHIO gate (11th Avenue)
- August 14 "Ohio Fair Managers Day" – McGuffey Lane performed at 7:30 p.m only
- August 15 Bob Hope, Paragon, David Rubinoff performed at 7:30 p.m. only
- August 16 McGuffy Lane at 3:30 and Mac Davis at 7:30 pm
- August 17 "Children's Home Day" – Johnny Cash
- August 18 Mac Davis
- August 19 Statler Brothers
- August 20 "ABN Day" – Sha Na Na
- August 21 "Ohio Agriculture Day and Crippled Children's Day" – Kool & the Gang
- August 22 "Youth Conservation Corp Day" – Barbara Mandrell
- August 23 "Ohio National Guard Day" – Louise Mandrell and RC Bannon
- August 24 "Auctioneers Day" Sale of Champions at 3pm in Cooper Arena K.C. and the Sunshine Band
- August 25 Boxcar Willie
- August 26 Mickey Gilley, Johnny Lee and the Urban Cowboy Band
- August 27 Eddie Rabbitt, Betty Carson & the Younger Brothers Band
- August 28 Gladys Knight & the Pips
- August 29 Crystal Gayle
- August 30 Peaches & Herb

1983 – Michael Stanley Band, Sheena Easton, The O'Jays, Dionne Warwick, The Gatlin Brothers, Kool And The Gang, Melissa Manchester, Juice Newton, Danny Thomas, The Beach Boys, Reba McEntire, Mel Tillis, Air Supply, America, The Dazz Band, Midnight Star, Anne Murray, and Kenny Loggins performed. Wheel of Fortune taped several episodes at the fairgrounds during the running of the fair.

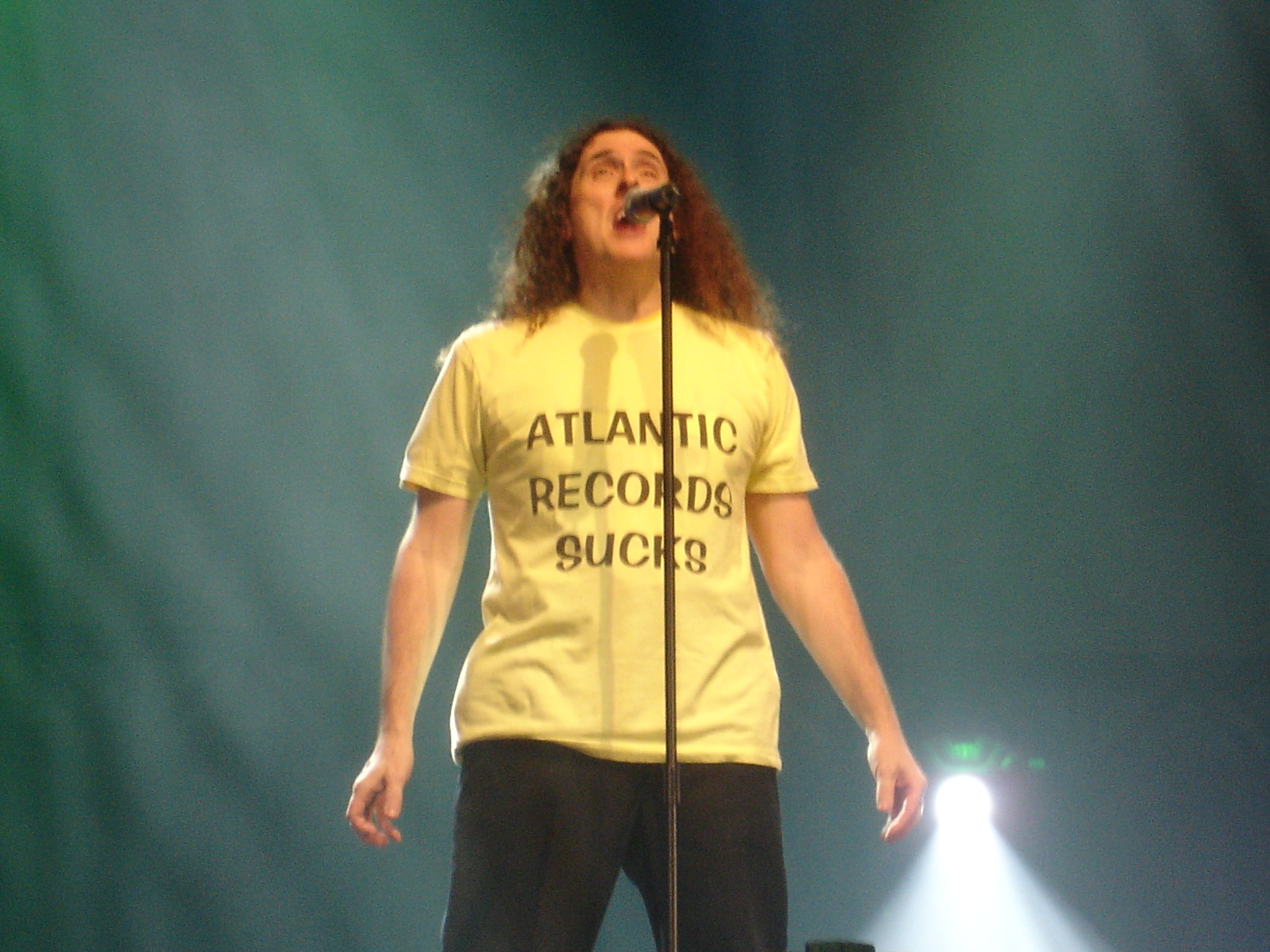
"Weird Al" Yankovic in August 2007

1989 – New Kids on the Block performed. Their performance was marred by several people being injured in a crush.

1990 – The condemned Ohio State Fair Grandstand was demolished. The Celeste Center replaced it as the site for the Fair's big-name entertainment, as well as a venue for many Expo events each year.

1997 – Wheel of Fortune premiered their 15th season with two weeks of taped shows.

2000 – The Ohio State Fair celebrated its 150th anniversary with a new exhibit, "History in the Making." Alabama performed.

2002 – The 11th Avenue OHIO gate, built in 1966, was torn down and replaced with a redesigned, contemporary OHIO gate to take the facility into the future. Willie Nelson, Vince Gill, Travis Tritt, Rascal Flatts, Michael W. Smith, and Lifehouse performed.

2003 – The 150th Fair was celebrated. The first Fair was in 1850 and there had been one every year since, excluding 1942–1945. Celebration activities could be found all over the fair. Bow Wow, Alan Jackson, Uncle Kracker, Terri Clark, The Oak Ridge Boys, and Diamond Rio performed.

2020 - In response to the COVID-19 pandemic, it was announced on May 21 that the 2020 Ohio State Fair was canceled.

2021 – The fair returned after the previous year's hiatus, but limited to livestock & educational contests. The general public was forced to hold on to their 2020 tickets in 2021 due to the continued uncertainty of the COVID-19 pandemic that year.

2022 - Live concerts and a full fair returned after a two-year hiatus. Tickets withheld from 2020 had been valid.
