= American folk music =

Roots and traditional music from the United States

The term American folk music encompasses numerous music genres, variously known as traditional music, traditional folk music, contemporary folk music, vernacular music, or roots music. Many traditional songs have been sung within the same family or folk group for generations, and sometimes trace back to such origins as the British Isles, Mainland Europe, or Africa. Musician Mike Seeger once famously commented that the definition of American folk music is "...all the music that fits between the cracks."

American folk music is a broad category of music including bluegrass, gospel, old time music, jug bands, Appalachian folk, blues, Cajun and Native American music. This music is considered American either because it is native to the United States or because it developed in the United States, out of foreign origins, becoming culturally significant. It is considered "roots music" because it served as the basis of music later developed in the United States, including rock and roll, rhythm and blues, and jazz. Much of this music was created to embody the experiences of working class people during times of hardship.

== Early American folk music ==
Most songs of the Colonial and Revolutionary periods originated in England, Scotland and Ireland and were brought over by early settlers. According to ethnomusicologist Bruno Nettl, American folk music is notable because it "At its roots is an English folk song tradition that has been modified to suit the specific requirements of America." Therefore, many American folk songs, such as those documented by the American folklorist Francis James Child in his catalogue of ballads known as the Child Ballads, can be traced back to their pre-colonial origins in the British Isles. For example, "Barbara Allen" remains a popular traditional ballad originating in England and Scotland, which immigrants introduced to the United States. The murder ballad "Pretty Polly", indexed by another scholar of American folk music, George Malcolm Laws, is an American version of an earlier British song, "The Gosport Tragedy". The oldest surviving folk song of local Anglo-American origin is the ballad "Springfield Mountain" dating back to 1761 in Connecticut.

The typical instruments played in early American folk music were the fiddle, the guitar, the mandolin, the mouth organ, the fife, and the dulcimer, although guitars went through a significant change as the previously popular English guitar was replaced around the 1830s by the Spanish guitar.

In addition to ballads, American colonials also imported numerous English country dance tunes, mainly jigs, reels, and hornpipes, which were played during community dances or contra dances. Some dance tunes as well as dances themselves were also adapted from Irish and Scottish sources. The musical collections Howe's 1000 Jigs and Reels, Ryan's Mammoth Collection, and 1000 Fiddle Tunes contain many of the dance tunes Americans and their colonial predecessors danced to for nearly two centuries. Popular dances that rose to prominence in America in the nineteenth century, which could be set to traditional dance tunes, were quadrilles, mazurkas, barn dances, redowas, marches, and polkas. "Soldier's Joy" is an example of a typical British fiddle tune.

In New England, one of the areas with the earliest history of colonization as well as the highest percentage of settlement by ethnic English people, numerous English ballads survived within American folk music into the twentieth century. These include older popular ballads such as "Lord Randall", "The Golden Vanity", The Elfin Knight, The Gypsy Davy, "Lady Isabel and the Elf-Knight", "Barbara Allen", Lord Bateman, The House Carpenter, The Farmer's Curst Wife, Lord Lovel, and Henry Martin. Later broadside ballads imported into New England from the British Isles include "The Yorkshire Bite", "The Bold Soldier", "Butcher Boy", "Katie Morey", "The Half Hitch", and "The Boston Burglar". Locally composed, traditional New England folk songs include "Springfield Mountain", "The Jam on Gerry's Rock", "Young Charlotte", "Peter Amberly", "Jack Haggarty, and "The Jealous Lover". The folk music of the rest of Northeastern United States, including Pennsylvania, New York, and New Jersey, was similar to that of New England, aside from a marked influence from the high numbers of non-British immigrants, such as the Germans, Dutch, and Swiss.

In the Southeastern United States, popular local folk songs included "Sourwood Mountain", "Charming Betsy", "Fly Around My Pretty Little Miss", "Buffalo Gals", "Arkansas Traveler", "Turkey in the Straw", "Old Joe Clark", "Going Down the Road Feeling Bad", "Shady Grove", "Katy Cline", "Ida Red", and "Cindy". The southern murder ballad "Poor Ellen Smith", which recorded a murder so inflammatory its public performance had to be outlawed, was most likely written in Winston, North Carolina by one of the murderer's cellmates. Unlike the Northeast and New England, the Southeast had significant influence from African-American music and as a result instruments such as the banjo were widely adopted. However, English traditional music was still present in the Southeast with older Child ballads such as "Lord Thomas and Fair Eleanor", "The Maid Freed from the Gallows", "Fair Margaret and Sweet William", "The Wife of Usher's Well", "The Two Sisters", and "Matty Groves" surviving alongside some English ballads also played in the Northeast like "Barbara Allen". Popular broadside ballads in the Southeast were "Pretty Polly", "Pretty Little Miss in the Garden", "Knoxville Girl", "Jack Monroe", "The Sailor Boy", "Awake, Awake You Drowsy Sleeper", "Rich Irish Lady", "The Nightingale", "The Girl I Left Behind", and "The Miller's Will". Notable songs written in Appalachia include "Little Mohea", "John Hardy", and "Omie Wise". Unlike in the Northeast, Southeastern ballads of English origins tend to be appreciably altered with their lyrics shortened and smoothed out, reducing the number of stresses per stanza.

Folk songs in the Midwest largely reflected the tastes of New England and the Mid-Atlantic states. However, there were some ballads uniquely popular to the Midwest such as the broadside ballad "Mary of the Wild Moor" and the locally produced ballads namely "The Little Brown Bulls", "Fuller and Warren", "Charles Guiteau", "Canady-I-O", and "Paul Jones". Many folk songs were also produced that were unique specifically to the Great Lakes region, evoking the area's nautical culture. These include "It's me for the Inland Lakes", "Loss of the Persian", and "The Buffalo Whore". Farther west in states like Iowa, Kansas, the Dakotas, and Nebraska regional songs included "The Little Old Sod Shanty on the Claim", "The Lane County Bachelor", "Comin' Back to Kansas", "The Dreary Black Hills", and "Dakota Land". The famous "Ballad of Jesse James", which celebrated the titular bank robber's life, first appeared in Springfield, Missouri.

Few Child or broadside ballads have been found in the Northwestern United States as the documented folk songs in the area are usually work songs connected to relatively recent folk experiences within the mining, lumber, and other industries of the nineteenth and twentieth century.

Similar to the Northwest, older traditional ballads were far less common in the Southwest, with only "Barbara Allen" and "Lord Randal" being regional favorites. Popular local songs and ballads were, among others, "Texas Rangers", "The Yellow Rose of Texas", "Joe Bowers", "Sweet Betsy from Pike", "Ho for California!", and "Buffalo Skinners".

Some songs entered the folk tradition through the flourishing American popular music industry. One such popular song that became a folk tune was "Old Dan Tucker" written by Dan Emmett.

=== Spirituals ===
Spirituals have their origins in white American ministers appropriating European folk melodies and setting them to religious lyrics, creating uniquely American folk hymns. African Americans adopted this religious folk music, adding their own style and themes such as slavery and emancipation. "Sacred music, both a Capella and instrumentally accompanied, is at the heart of the tradition. Early spirituals framed Christian beliefs within native practices and were heavily influenced by the music and rhythms of Africa." Spirituals are prominent, and often use a call and response pattern. "Gospel developed after the Civil War (1861-65). It relied on biblical text for much of its direction, and the use of metaphors and imagery was common. Gospel is a "joyful noise," sometimes accompanied by instrumentation and almost always punctuated by hand clapping, toe tapping, and body movement."

=== African-American folk music ===
When African slaves were brought to the Americas, husbands were separated from wives and parents from their children. Also the many tribes that the slaves were from were broken up and the ensuing slave communities that were set up were constituted by every possible mixture. What the slaves had in common was the desire to dance, sing and play what musical instruments could be assembled. Eileen Southern in The Music of Black Americans: A History lists about a dozen and a half African-American "folksong types". These are "boat songs, corn songs, cowboy songs, dance songs, freedom songs, harvest songs, parodies of spirituals, pattyroller songs, prison songs, railroad songs, satirical songs, shout songs, spirituals, stevedore songs, story songs, war songs, woodcutter songs, and work songs."

Because slaves were forbidden to perform African ceremonies or use African languages, "the slaves filled this cultural vacuum by acquiring the rudiments of Anglo-American folk song, British country dancing and European harmony, and adapting them to West African patterns." Alan Lomax in The Folk Songs of North America states, "The slaves, brought to the United States from many parts of Africa, continued to dance and make music as their ancestors had done…. In the United States tribes were mixed and African languages and ceremonies were forbidden, and the slaves filled the cultural vacuum by acquiring the rudiments of Anglo-American folk song, British country dancing, and European harmony, and adapting them to West African patterns." Lomax, after maintaining that "whatever they sang was intensely functional," catalogs these songs as "spirituals, reels, work songs, ballads and blues."

=== Work songs ===
==== Sea shanties ====
Sea shanties functioned to lighten the burden of routine tasks and provide a rhythm that helped workers perform as a team. One of the oldest sea shanties sung in America may have been "Haul in the Bowline" which possibly dates back to the reign of Henry VIII in the sixteenth century. Other popular shanties include "Blow the Man Down", "Blow, Boys, Blow", "Reuben Ranzo", "Shenandoah" and "The Greenland Whale" as well as African-American shanties such as "Mobile Bay" and "I'm Goin' up the River".

==== Cowboy songs ====
Cowboys songs are typically ballads that cowboys sang in the West and Southwest. The familiar "Streets of Laredo" (or "Cowboys Lament") derives from an Irish folk song of the late 18th century called "The Unfortunate Rake", which in turn appears to have descended from the even earlier "The Bard of Armagh". While "Streets of Laredo" uses the same melody as "The Unfortunate Rake", "St. James Infirmary Blues" adapts the story to a different tune. This illustrates how folk songs can change in the retelling and appear in a variety of versions. Similarly the popular cowboy song "Bury Me Not on the Lone Prairie, about a dying cowboy begging not to be buried alone in the wilderness, is based on an earlier poem, "The Ocean Burial". Similarly, the popular song "Buffalo Skinners" is based on the earlier lumberjack tune "Canaday-I-O".

Other songs originated wholly on the frontier such as the famous "Home on the Range" written in Kansas in 1873 by Brewster Higley and Dan Kelly. "The Old Chisholm Trail" too was a distinctly American ballad tied to the experiences of cowboys on the long treks on the Chisholm Trail.

Following the Civil War, cowboys became popular as characters in novels and in Wild West shows. The first movie western was The Great Train Robbery, filmed in 1903. At the height of this romanticizing of the American cowboy, John Lomax published his preeminent work, Cowboy Songs and Other Frontier Ballads. This work was acclaimed in both academic and popular readership and helped to expand the scope of what constituted folk music, as previous scholarship focused on songs with European ballad ancestry, such as with the Child Ballads. While Cowboy Songs may have opened the door to legitimizing a wider range of vernacular music in the field of American folk music scholarship, in later years it has been criticized for not being a strictly scientific historical endeavor. Lomax himself admitted, "I have violated the ethics of ballad-gatherers, in a few instances, by selecting and putting together what seems to be the best lines from different versions, all telling the same story...Frankly the volume is meant to be popular."

==== Railroad songs ====
One of the most popular railroad folk songs in American history was The Ballad of Casey Jones, a song about a train conductor who sacrificed himself to prevent a collision. The "Ballad of John Henry" is about an African-American folk hero said to have worked as a "steel-driving man".

==== Coal mining songs ====
The earliest known coal mine was in Richmond Virginia in 1750. Coal became the primary source of fuel in the United States by the 1880s, beating out wood, with usage peaking in 1910. Coal camps were made up of a largely Irish and Welsh demographic, which is evident in the structure of coal mining songs. Coal mining was fraught with danger that was unmitigated by morally indifferent mining companies. Explosions and cave-ins were a constant fear, as were black lung disease and pneumoconiosis. Songs such as "Don't Go Down in the Mine", "The Dying Mine Brakeman", and "A Miner's Prayer" gave voice to these fears. Efforts to unionize began in the 1930s, creating tunes such as "We Shall Not Be Moved", which was a rewriting of the gospel hymn "I Shall Not Be Moved". The use of familiar hymns made the songs easy for organizers to sing along with, and also imbued the cause with an air of righteousness.

"Sixteen Tons" was written in 1946 by Merle Travis about the plight of coal miners and life in company towns. Travis also penned "Dark as a Dungeon", which was most notably performed by Johnny Cash.

==== Textile factory songs ====
While American colonists had long spun and wove homemade textiles, a burgeoning industry began to appear at the end of the eighteenth century in New England and later in the southern states. Working conditions in textile mills were bleak, with extremely long hours and meager pay for the men, women, and children employed within. Strikes began in the 1830s and 1840s, led by the young women who made up three-quarters of the work force, and earned about half of their male coworkers. The song "A Factory Girl" tells of a young woman, dissatisfied with her occupation, leaving the mill to become a wife. Dave McCarn wrote songs in protest of the textile mill such as "Cotton Mill Colic", which lamented the insufficient and inequitable pay scale and poverty that ensued.

==== Logging songs ====
The logging industry began in New England to satisfy the needs of ship building. Later, the advent of the transcontinental railroad made it possible to harvest the forests of the Pacific Northwest, with the industry reaching a peak from 1870 to 1900. The hardships for loggers included a struggle with natural forces, unpredictable outdoor working conditions, and the danger of precarious stacks of logs stories high that could topple. "The Jam on Gerry's Rocks" was one such song that described this terrifying phenomenon. "The Lumberjack's Alphabet" was a high-spirited song and favorite of these workers.

==== Linemen songs ====
"The Lineman's Hymn" is told from the perspective of a dying lineman who fell from a pole, and warns the listener to be careful lest he suffer the same fate.

== American roots music ==
Many roots musicians do not consider themselves folk musicians. The main difference between the American folk music revival and American "roots music" is that roots music seems to cover a broader range, including blues and country.

Roots music developed its most expressive and varied forms in the first three decades of the 20th century. The Great Depression and the Dust Bowl were extremely important in disseminating these musical styles to the rest of the country, as Delta blues masters, itinerant honky tonk singers, and Cajun musicians spread to cities like Chicago, Los Angeles, and New York. The growth of the recording industry in the same period was also important; higher potential profits from music placed pressure on artists, songwriters, and label executives to replicate previous hit songs. This meant that musical trends, such as Hawaiian slack-key guitar, never died out completely, since a broad range of rhythms, instruments, and vocal stylings were incorporated into disparate popular genres.

By the 1950s, forms of roots music had led to pop-oriented forms. Folk musicians like the Kingston Trio, blues-derived rock and roll and rockabilly, pop-gospel, doo wop and R&B (later secularized further as soul music) and the Nashville sound in country music all modernized and expanded the musical palette of the country.

The roots approach to music emphasizes the diversity of American musical traditions, the genealogy of creative lineages and communities, and the innovative contributions of musicians working in these traditions today. In recent years roots music has been the focus of popular media programs such as Garrison Keillor's public radio program, A Prairie Home Companion and the feature film by the same name.

== Regional forms ==
American traditional music is also called roots music. Roots music is a broad category of music including bluegrass, country music, gospel, old time music, jug bands, Appalachian folk, blues, Cajun and Native American music. The music is considered American either because it is native to the United States or because it developed there, out of foreign origins, to such a degree that it struck musicologists as something distinctly new. It is considered "roots music" because it served as the basis of music later developed in the United States, including rock and roll, contemporary folk music, rhythm and blues, and jazz.

=== Appalachian music ===
Appalachian music is the traditional music of the region of Appalachia in the Eastern United States. It derives from various European and African influences—including English ballads, Irish and Scottish traditional music (especially fiddle music), hymns, and African-American blues. First recorded in the 1920s, Appalachian musicians were a key influence on the early development of Old-time music, country music, and bluegrass, and were an important part of the American folk music revival.

Instruments typically used to perform Appalachian music include the banjo, American fiddle, fretted dulcimer, and guitar.

Early recorded Appalachian musicians include Fiddlin' John Carson, Henry Whitter, Bascom Lamar Lunsford, the Carter Family, Clarence Ashley, Frank Proffitt, and Dock Boggs, all of whom were initially recorded in the 1920s and 1930s. Several Appalachian musicians obtained renown during the folk revival of the 1950s and 1960s, including Jean Ritchie, Roscoe Holcomb, Ola Belle Reed, Lily May Ledford, and Doc Watson.

The Carter Family was a traditional American folk music group that recorded between 1927 and 1956. Their music had a profound impact on bluegrass, country, Southern Gospel, pop and rock musicians. They were the first vocal group to become country music stars; a beginning of the divergence of country music from traditional folk music. Their recordings of such songs as "Wabash Cannonball" (1932), "Will the Circle Be Unbroken" (1935), "Wildwood Flower" (1928), and "Keep on the Sunny Side" (1928) made them country standards.

Country and bluegrass artists such as Loretta Lynn, Roy Acuff, Dolly Parton, Earl Scruggs, Chet Atkins, and Don Reno were heavily influenced by traditional Appalachian music. Artists such as Bob Dylan, Jerry Garcia, and Bruce Springsteen have performed Appalachian songs or rewritten versions of Appalachian songs.

=== Cajun music ===
Cajun music, an emblematic music of Louisiana, is rooted in the ballads of the French-speaking Acadians of Canada. Cajun music is often mentioned in tandem with the Creole-based, Cajun-influenced zydeco form, both of Acadiana origin. These French Louisiana sounds have influenced American popular music for many decades, especially country music, and have influenced pop culture through mass media, such as television commercials.

=== Oklahoma and southern US plains ===
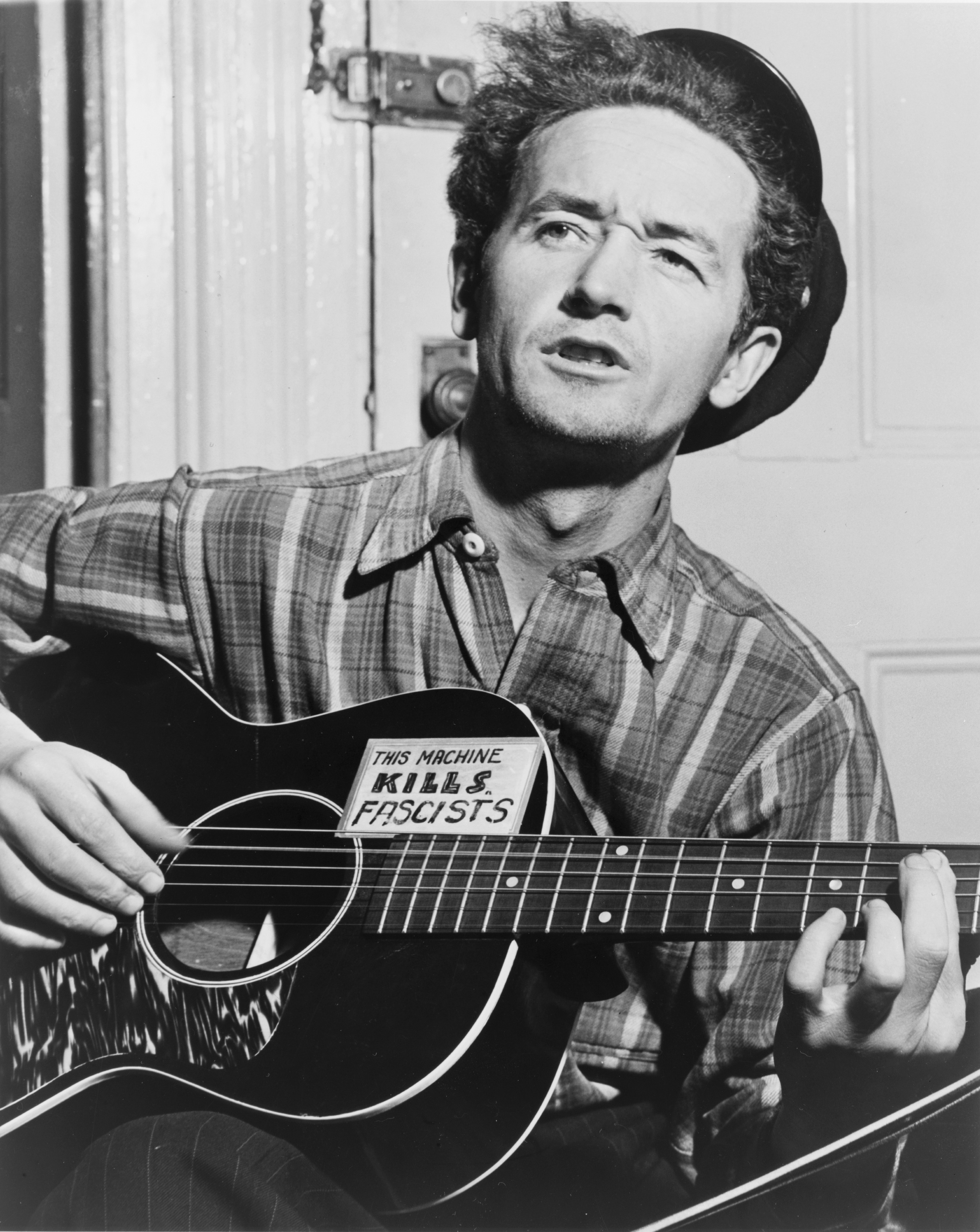
Singer-songwriter Woody Guthrie emerged from the dust bowl of Oklahoma and the Great Depression in the mid-20th Century, with lyrics that embraced his views on ecology, poverty, and unionization in the United States, paired with melody reflecting the many genres of American folk music.

Before recorded history American Indians in this area used songs and instrumentation; music and dance remain the core of ceremonial and social activities. "Stomp dance" remains at its core, a "call and response" form; instrumentation is provided by rattles or shackles worn on the legs of women. "Other southeastern nations have their own complexes of sacred and social songs, including those for animal dances and friendship dances, and songs that accompany stickball games.

Central to the music of the southern Plains Indians is the drum, which has been called the heartbeat of Plains Indian music. Most of that genre traces back to the hunting and warfare that was a strong part of plains culture. During the reservation period, they frequently used music to relieve boredom and despair. Neighbors gathered, exchanged and created songs and dances. This is a part of the roots of the modern intertribal powwow. Another common instrument is the courting flute.

Shape-note or sacred harp singing developed in the early nineteenth century as a way for itinerant singing instructors to teach church songs in rural communities. They taught using song books that represented musical notation of tones by geometric shapes that associated a shape with a pitch. Sacred harp singing became popular in many Oklahoma rural communities, regardless of ethnicity.

Later, the blues tradition developed, with roots in and parallels to sacred music. By the early 20th century, jazz developed, born from a "blend of ragtime, gospel, and blues" "Anglo-Scots-Irish music traditions gained a place in Oklahoma after the Land Run of 1889. Because of its size and portability, the fiddle was the core of early Oklahoma Anglo music, but other instruments such as the guitar, mandolin, banjo, and steel guitar were added later. Various Oklahoma music traditions trace their roots to the British Isles, including cowboy ballads, western swing, and contemporary country and western." "Mexican immigrants began to reach Oklahoma in the 1870s, bringing beautiful canciones and corridos love songs, waltzes, and ballads along with them. Like American Indian communities, each rite of passage in Hispanic communities is accompanied by traditional music.

The acoustic guitar, string bass, and violin provide the basic instrumentation for Mexican music, with maracas, flute, horns, or sometimes accordion filling out the sound." Other Europeans (such as Bohemians and Germans) settled in the late nineteenth century. Their social activities centered on community halls, "where local musicians played polkas and waltzes on the accordion, piano, and brass instruments."

Later Asians contributed to the musical mix. "Ancient music and dance traditions from the temples and courts of China, India, and Indonesia are preserved in Asian communities throughout the state, and popular song genres are continually layered on to these classical music forms"

=== The American Southwest and South Texas ===
Tejano and New Mexico music, heard throughout the American Southwest and South Texas, is rooted in the musics of the Native American and Hispanic/Latino communities of the regions. Tejano music is also heavily influenced by Regional Mexican and Country music, while New Mexico music is much more influenced by Hispano folk and Western music. Both styles have influenced one another over the years, and incorporated American popular music styles.

=== Other forms ===
Folk composer and musician Robert Schmertz composed and wrote pieces related to historical events in Western Pennsylvania.

== 20th century folk revival music ==
Starting in the mid-20th century a phenomenon termed the folk music revival began, forming a new contemporary type of folk music. It was somewhat centered on but not limited to the United States. While sometimes termed the American Folk Music Revival, it was somewhat international and does not fit some narrower definitions of American folk music even when the artists were American. Prominent artists from this movement include Pete Seeger, Woody Guthrie, The Weavers, Burl Ives, and others. A more commercially oriented version of folk music emerged in the 1960s, including performers such as The Kingston Trio, The Limeliters, The Brothers Four, Peter, Paul and Mary, Joan Baez, The Highwaymen, Judy Collins, The New Christy Minstrels, and Gordon Lightfoot, as well as counterculture and folk rock performers including Bob Dylan, The Byrds, Arlo Guthrie, and Buffy Sainte-Marie.

== Books ==
- Series: Greenwood Guides to American Roots Music, edited by Norm Cohen. Titles include, Folk Music, Country, Blues, Jazz, and Ethnic and Border Music.
- Norm Cohen, Long Steel Rail: The Railroad in American Folksong (Urbana, IL: University of Illinois Press, 2nd ed., 2000)
- Fiona Ritchie and Doug Orr, Wayfaring Strangers: The Musical Voyage from Scotland and Ulster to Appalachia (University of North Carolina Press, 2014). Includes a foreword by Dolly Parton and 20 track CD.
- Benjamin Filene, Romancing the Folk: Public Memory and American Roots Music (Chapel Hill and London: University of North Carolina Press, 2000)
- Rachel Clare Donaldson, "I Hear American Singing": Folk Music and National Identity (Philadelphia: Temple University Press, 2014)
- Kip Lornell, Exploring American Folk Music: Ethnic, Grassroots, and Regional Traditions in the United States (Jackson: University Press of Mississippi, 2012)
- Robert Santelli, American Roots Music--Based on the PBS Television Series (Abrams, 2001), foreword by Bonnie Raitt
- In 2004, NPR published the book titled The NPR Curious Listener's Guide to American Folk Music, Linda Ronstadt wrote the foreword.
- The Never-Ending Revival: Rounder Records and the Folk Alliance by Michael F. Scully (University of Illinois Press, 2008)
- Nettl, Bruno. An Introduction to Folk Music in the United States. Rev. ed. Detroit, Mich.: Wayne State University Press, 1962.
- In 2007, James P. Leary published Polkabilly: How the Goose Island Ramblers Redefined American Folk Music, which proposes a redefinition of traditional American folk music and identifies a new genre of music from the Upper Midwest known as Polkabilly, which blends ethnic music, old-time country music, and polka. The book was awarded the American Folklore Society's Chicago Folklore Prize for the best book in the field of folklore scholarship.

== Film, TV, and radio ==
"Yellow Rose Of Texas" (1858)
"The Yellow Rose of Texas" performed by the United States Coast Guard Band

"Oh! Susanna" (1848)
Stephen Foster's "Oh! Susanna" performed by the United States Navy Concert Band

Hootenanny, a weekly musical variety show broadcast on the ABC network in the U.S. in 1963–1964, primarily featured folk musicians.

The soundtrack of the 2000 film O Brother, Where Art Thou? is exclusively roots music, performed by Alison Krauss, The Fairfield Four, Emmylou Harris, Norman Blake and others.

In 2001, PBS broadcast a 4-part documentary series, American Roots Music, that explored the historical roots of American roots music through footage and performances by the creators of the movement.

The 2003 film A Mighty Wind is a tribute to (and parody of) the folk-pop musicians of the early 1960s.

A six-hour public television series, The Music of America: History Through Musical Traditions, appeared in 2010.

PBS series Country Music by Ken Burns, 8 episodes. "Explore the remarkable stories of the people and places behind a true American art form." Gives insight into the folk heritage of what would become country music.

BBC radio program Black Roots, Grammy Award-winning musician Rhiannon Giddens explores the history of African American roots music through the stories of forgotten black pioneers.

Gilliland, John (1969). "Blowin' in the Wind: Pop discovers folk music" (audio). Pop Chronicles. University of North Texas Libraries.

== See also ==
- American folk music revival
- Anthology of American Folk Music
- List of North American folk music traditions
- Protest songs in the United States
