= List of songs by Robert Schmertz =

This is the list of songs by Robert Watson "Bob" Schmertz (March 4, 1898 – June 7, 1975). These printed and published songs are part of the Robert Schmertz Collection which is housed in the Archives Service Center, University Library System, University of Pittsburgh. These printed versions are available for academic, historical research and genealogy studies. The university provides access without charge. Schmertz was born in Pittsburgh and attended college there. He wrote the Carnegie Tartans' fight song "Fight for the Glory of Carnegie," and played the banjo. He graduated in 1921 and then taught at the college until his retirement. Many of his songs were based upon historical events that occurred in Western Pennsylvania, Allegheny County, and the city of Pittsburgh.

Before his death on June 7, 1975, he completed a book of his songs, but it wasn't published until after his death. This is the list of songs and manuscripts written by Robert Schmertz. Most of the originals held in the University of Pittsburgh archives are written in his own hand.

Songs by Robert Schmertz
Song	Archive call reference	Pages	Description
Ardvark	box 3, folder 9	one	music manuscript
Chandu	box 3, folder 10	four	Ink on paper, written with Matthew W. Frey
Cousin Althea	box 3, folder 9	one	music manuscript
Dogwood Hollow	box 3, folder 12	one	music manuscript
My Sweetheart Wears the Plaid	box 3, folder 12	three	music manuscript
My Wild Irish Rose is Wilder than She Used to Be	box 3 folder 14	three	music manuscript-Words by Robert Schmertz. Music by Robert Schmertz and Adolph Herzberg.
Dumbella 1st violin arrangement	box 3, folder 17	one	music manuscript
If you Would be a Sailor's Wife arranged for 1st violin	box 3, folder 18	one	music manuscript arranged by J.L. Rosen.
In Barcelona 1st violin	box 3, folder 19	one	music manuscript
Nicest Girl arranged for 1st violin	box 3, folder 20	two	music manuscript
Old Place arranged for 1st violin	box 3, folder 21	one	music manuscript
Celoran	-	one	this song was published in 1959 by Folkways Records and Service Corp., NYC, USA
Ohio Company	box 89, folder 27	four	music pages, arranged by Frank C. Jarema.
Ship Ahoy	box 3, folder 22	two	music manuscript, arranged for violin.
Moonlight Maid	Box 3, Folder 23i	one	music manuscript for 1st violin
49 Angels	Box 3, Folder 24	two	music manuscript
Braddock's Defeat	Box 3, folder 25	two	music manuscript, arranged by Frank C. Jarema.
Flintlock Finnegan	Box 3, Folder 26	two	music manuscript, arranged by Frank C. Jarema.
Never Touch Water; Never Touch Water (front) Dogwood Hollow (back)	Box 3, Folder 28; Box 3, Folder 29	two	music manuscript, arranged by Frank C. Jarema.
Piney Mountain	Box 3, Folder 30	two	music manuscript, arranged by Frank C. Jarema.
Prettiest Girl in Pittsburgh Town	Box 3, Folder 31	two	music manuscript, arranged by Frank C. Jarema.
No One I Care For But You	Box 3, Folder 32	two	flute arrangement, music manuscript.
Open the Doors of Delight	Box 3, Folder 33	four	music manuscript, words by Robert Schmertz, music by Robert Schmertz and Adolph Herzberg.
There's No One I Care for But You	Box 3, Folder 34	two	music manuscript, arranged for 1st violin, arranged by J.L. Rosen.
Davy Jones	Box 3, Folder 35	two	music manuscript for flute, arranged by J.L. Rosen.
Dumbella	Box 3 Folder 36	one	music manuscript arranged for flute.
In Barcelona	Box 3, Folder 37	one	music manuscript arranged for flute
Nicest Girl	Box 3, Folder 38	one	music manuscript.
Old Place	Box 3, Folder 39	one	music manuscript arranged for flute
Ship Ahoy	Box 3, Folder 40	two	music manuscript, arranged by J.L. Rosen.
Toreador	Box 3, Folder 41	three	music manuscript arranged for flute
