= Céloron de Blainville =

Céloron de Blainville is a French family of officers and colonial administrators, who notably played a role in New France beginning in the 17th century. One member, Pierre Joseph Céloron de Blainville, is the subject of a folk song by Robert Schmertz entitled Celoron.

== Persons ==
Famous Céloron de Blainville family are :

- Jean-Baptiste Céloron de Blainville (born 1660 in Paris (France), still living in 1730), "seigneur" of Blainville, Quebec in New France. He married Hélène Picoté de Belestre, daughter of a military commander of Montreal.
- his son Pierre Joseph Céloron de Blainville (1693–1759), leader of the 1749 Ohio expedition.
- Paul Louis Maxime Celoron de Blainville (1831–1889), gouvernor of Mayotte in 1887-1888 Son of Pierre-Louis Céloron de Blainville (1753-??) and grandson of Pierre Joseph Céloron.

== Attention ==
The way of writing Céloron de Blainville is often wrong especially in modern documents :

- "Céloron" (or often Celoron in texts in English) is often miswritten "Celeron" or "Céleron", because of confusion with the Intel Celeron chipset of 2002.
- "Blainville" is often miswritten "Bienville", because of confusion with the name of the New France hero Jean-Baptiste Le Moyne de Bienville.
- So the writing "Celeron de Bienville" is common on the Internet but wrong.

== Places ==
From the family Céloron de Blainville, came :

- Celoron, New York, a village in New York state, USA.
- Boulevard Céloron, in Blainville, Quebec, Canada.
- Blainville, Quebec, a city in Quebec.
- Blainville (electoral district) in Quebec.
