= Shannopin's Town =

Native American village in Pennsylvania, US

- Historic Native American village
- Former location of Shannopin's Town in Pennsylvania Shannopin's Town (the United States)
- Coordinates: 40°27′55″N 79°57′55″W
- State: Pennsylvania
- Present-day Community: Lawrenceville (Pittsburgh)
- Founded: before 1730
- Abandoned: 1759

Population
  - Estimate (1750): 100−200

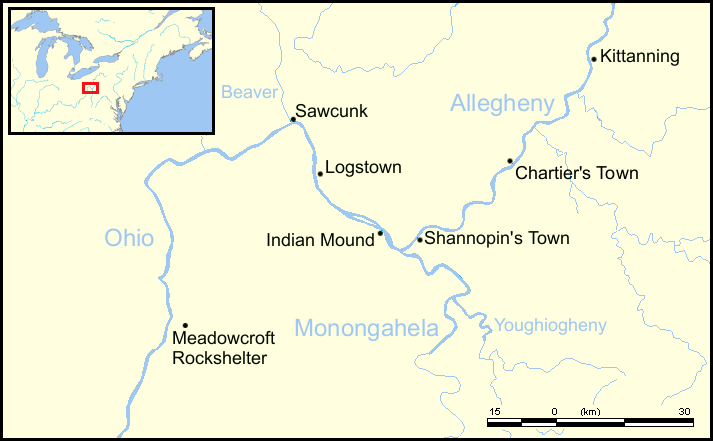
Shannopin's town relative to other Native American settlements on the upper Ohio River

Shannopin's Town, or Shannopintown, was an 18th-century Lenape (Delaware) town located within the site of modern-day Pittsburgh, Pennsylvania, along the Allegheny River, approximately two miles east from its junction with the Monongahela River. In the early 1700s, British colonial settlers began spreading into western Pennsylvania, forcing Lenape and other American Indian tribes to move further west, settling in the Ohio Country. Shannopin's Town was one of several communities established in western Pennsylvania in the 1720s. The town was largely abandoned during the construction of Fort Duquesne in 1754, although a small community still existed when General John Forbes' troops arrived in September 1758. The community was gone by the time construction on Fort Pitt was started in 1759.

== Establishment and location ==
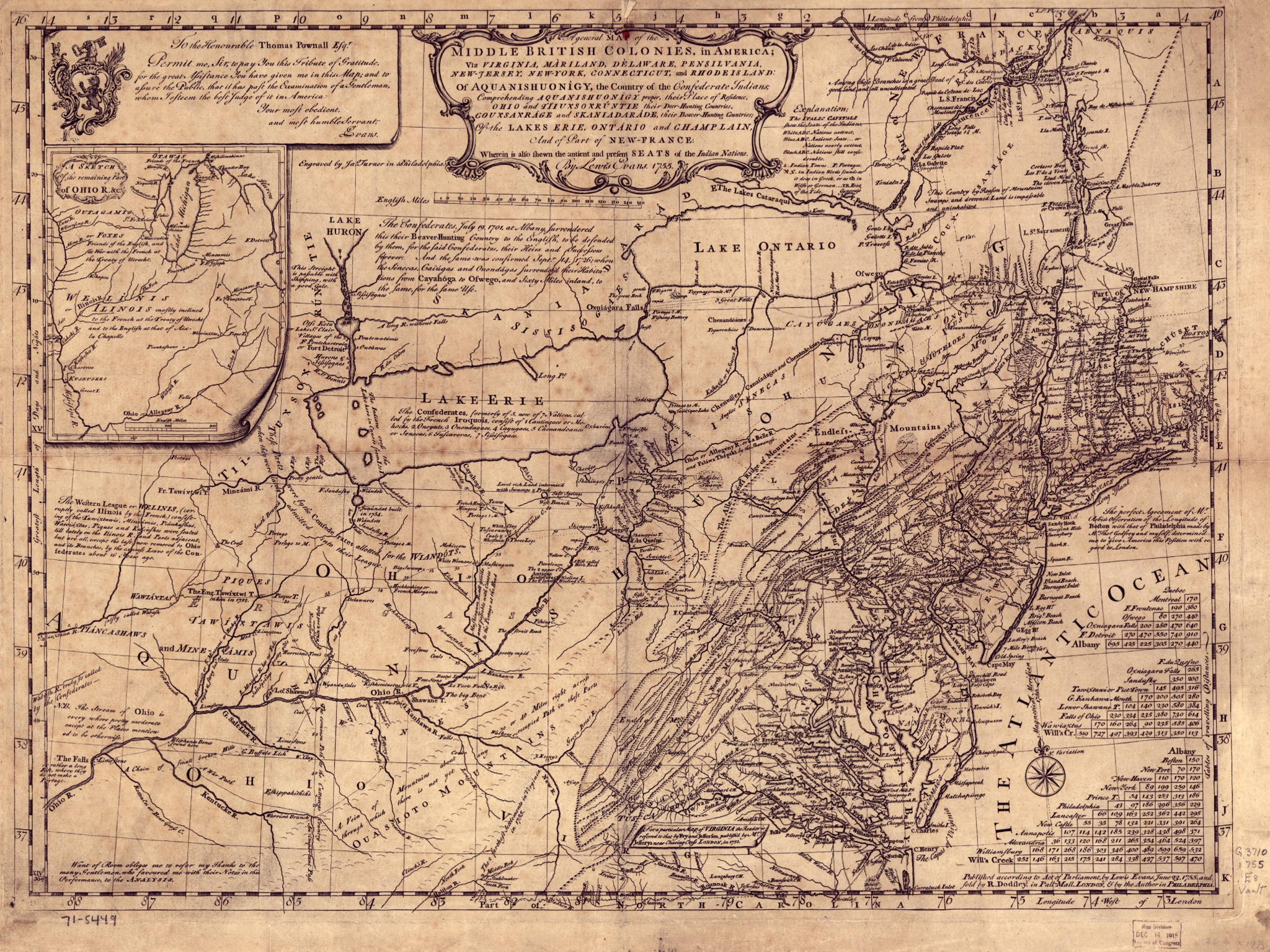
Lewis Evans' General Map of the Middle British Colonies in America, showing "Shanoppins T." near Fort Duquesne, just below the center of the map

The town or village is believed to have been settled by 1730.

Modern attempts to pinpoint the exact location of Shannopin's Town are based on settler's journals, early maps, and a burial site which was uncovered during building excavations in 1862. The village is believed to have been situated in what is now the city of Pittsburgh, roughly where Penn Avenue is today, below the mouth of Two Mile Run, from 30th Street to 39th Street. At this place the Raystown Trail leading from Harris' Ferry (Harrisburg, Pennsylvania) crossed the Allegheny River. According to George Croghan, the town was situated on the south bank of the Allegheny, nearly opposite what is now known as Herr's Island, in what is now the Lawrenceville neighborhood.

The town was near the western end-point of the Kittanning Path and at the southern terminus of the Venango Path. It was located at a convenient river crossing, within 16 miles of Logstown, about 20 miles from Chartier's Town, and a day's ride from Kittanning, all prominent communities with trading posts. Lewis Evans describes a ford near the town: "At Shannopin's there is a fording place in very dry times and the lowest down the river." William West reported that, on 16 June 1752, Shannopin's Town was found to be at "Forty Degrees twenty-seven minutes North latitude," according to a measurement taken by Joshua Fry.

On November 15, 1753, Lewis Montour informed the Governor and the Speaker of the Assembly that "Shanoppin Town" was situated about three miles above the Forks of the Monongahela. John Hogan, who was taken prisoner at the destruction of Fort Granville, and carried to Fort Duquesne in August, 1756, stated in a deposition in June 1757 that, "at about two miles' distance from Fort Duquesne, there was an Indian Town, containing fifty or sixty natives, of whom twenty were able to bear arms."

== Shannopin (Shawanoppan) ==
Little is known about Chief Shannopin, probably the founder of Shannopin's Town, who is also sometimes referred to as "Shawanoppan," "Shawanosson," and other variations of this name.

On 30 April 1730, Shannopin and five other Lenape leaders, "the chiefs of ye Delewares at Allegaeniny, on the main road," sent a letter, taken down by Edmund Cartledge and interpreted by James Le Tort, to Deputy Governor Patrick Gordon, protesting against the sale of rum in Lenape communities and asking the Governor to "prevent any further misfortunes for the future, we would request that the Governor would please regulate the Traders, and suppress such numbers of them from coming into the woods; and especially from bringing such large quantities of rum." The letter was to explain the death of two traders named John Hart and John Fisher, who were accidentally shot during a hunting expedition with a group of Lenapes in the fall of 1729. Another trader, David Robeson, was shot and beaten during an altercation. These incidents were blamed on intoxication by rum of those involved. Shannopin and the other signatories wanted to limit the free trade of rum and the numbers of people traveling from the European settlements in the east. The traders also complained that the rum trade had caused Indians in Shannopin's town to go into debt to the traders. Among the names signed to the message is that of "Shawanoppan his X mark."

On 8 August 1732 Shannopin's name appears signed to a message sent by the Delawares on the Allegheny to Deputy Governor Gordon, promising to come to Philadelphia the following spring. At Logstown on September 15, 1748 he made a speech to Conrad Weiser about the recent death of Chief Allumapees (Weiser refers to him as "Shawanasson").

Shannopin died between 1748 and 1751. The exact date is unknown, but a letter from Governor James Hamilton to George Croghan, dated 25 April 1751, refers to a promise Shannopin and other Lenape leaders made, to meet with colonial authorities following the death of Chief Allumapees in October, 1747. The letter states:

The Delawares...promised to visit their Brethren in Philadelphia to Consult with them about a new Chief, but those men who made such Promise, viz., Shawanapon and Others, are since dead..."

== Senangel's Town ==
On 29 October 1731, James Le Tort and his colleague Jonas Davenport were called to testify before Governor Patrick Gordon. Le Tort and Davenport had by then traveled to Native American communities across western Pennsylvania and knew them well. At the time of their examination, Davenport and Le Tort provided an estimate of the populations of the Allegheny settlements, and the names of their chiefs, including "Senangelstown," which has been assumed to be Shannopin's Town, with 16 families, 50 men, and a Delaware Chief named Senangel. Not all sources agree that this is Shannopin's Town, however. William Albert Hunter (1952) proposes that "Senangel's Town" was a separate community and that "Senangel" refers to Chief Sayningoe, mentioned in other colonial documents.

== Visit by Peter Chartier, 1743-45 ==
In 1743 Peter Chartier, a half-Shawnee Indian trader whose father was French-Canadian, moved to Shannopin's Town. He established a trading post on the Allegheny River about twenty miles upstream from the forks of the Ohio near the mouth of Chartiers Run, at what became Tarentum, known as Chartier's Town at the time, and Chartier's Old Town after it was abandoned in 1745. Chartier was in conflict with the Pennsylvania authorities because he opposed the sale of alcohol in Native American communities. In 1745 he declared his allegiance with the French and migrated to Kentucky, along with about 400 Pekowi Shawnees.

== Visit by Conrad Weiser, 1748 ==
Conrad Weiser spent the night of August 26, 1748 at Shannopin's Town on his way to Logstown for a meeting with chiefs of the Delaware, Shawnee, Iroquois and Wyandot nations. Among those accompanying Weiser was Benjamin Franklin's illegitimate son, William Franklin, only nineteen at the time, probably sent by his father as a part of his education. William's journey subsequently inspired his father's keen interest in the frontier.

== Visit by Céloron de Blainville, 1749 ==
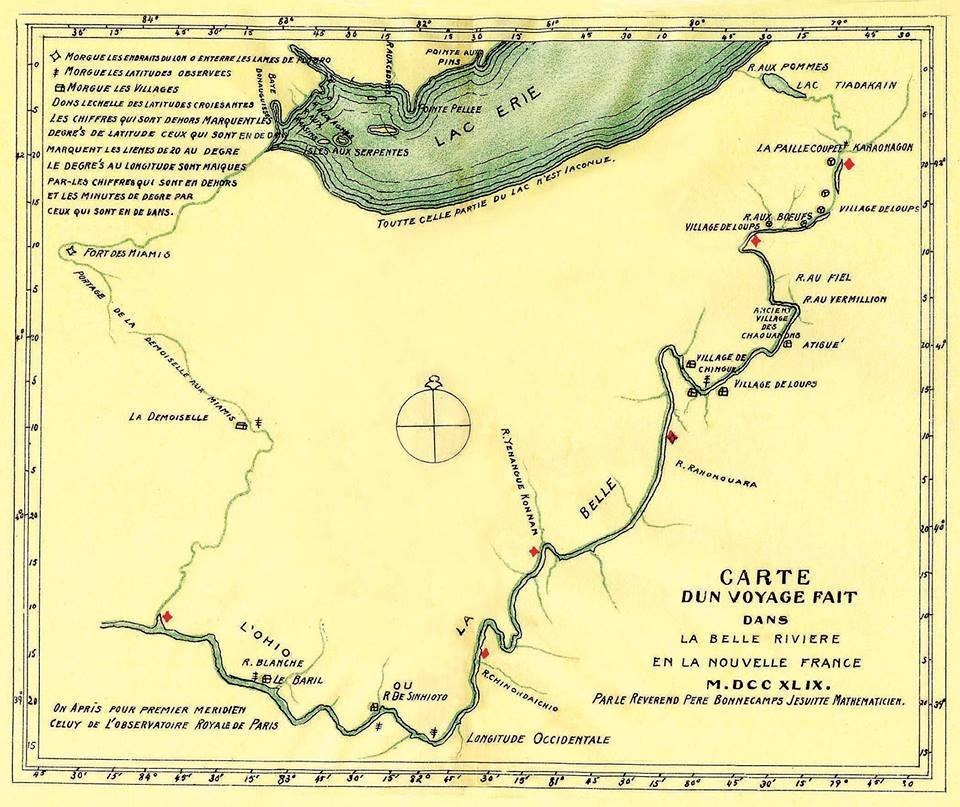
Map of the route followed by Pierre Joseph Céloron de Blainville along the Ohio River in 1749, drawn by Joseph Pierre de Bonnecamps. The southernmost "Village de Loups" is probably Shannopin's Town.

In 1749, the Comte de La Galissonière wanted to strengthen French control over the Ohio Country, and in August he ordered the military commander at Detroit, Pierre Joseph Céloron de Blainville to travel down the Ohio River to demonstrate French dominance. Leading a force of eight officers, six cadets, an armorer, 20 soldiers, 180 Canadians, 30 Iroquois and 25 Abenakis, Céloron moved down the river on a flotilla of 23 large boats and birch-bark canoes, on his "lead plate expedition," burying lead plates at six locations where major tributaries entered the Ohio and nailing copper plates bearing royal arms to trees to claim the territory for New France.

Céloron reached Kittanning on 6 August 1749 and arrived at Shannopin's Town the next day. He writes:

The 7th I passed by a Loup (Mohegan) village in which there were only three men. They had placed a white flag over their cabins, the rest of their people had gone to Chiningue, not hazarding to remain at home. I invited these three men to come along with me to Chiningue in order to hear what I had to say to them.

1751 map by Joshua Fry and Peter Jefferson depicting "Shannopin's T.," at the left upper margin

== Visit by Christopher Gist, 1750 ==
Christopher Gist first visited the town in November, 1750. Shannopin's Town was small, containing about twenty wigwams, fifty or sixty natives and twenty warriors. It was much visited by traders.

Gist writes:

Monday 19.—Set out early in the Morning...travelled very hard about 20 M to a small Indian Town of the Delawares called Shannopin on the SE Side of the River Ohio, where We rested and got Corn for our Horses.

Tuesday 20 Wednesday 21 Thursday 22 and Friday 23.—I was unwell and stayed in this Town to recover myself; While I was here I took an Opportunity to set my Compass privately, & took the Distance across the River, for I understood it was dangerous to let a Compass be seen among these Indians: The River Ohio is 76 Poles wide at Shannopin Town: There are about twenty Families in this Town: The Land in general from Potomack to this Place is mean stony and broken, here and there good Spots upon the Creeks and Branches but no Body of it.

Saturday 24.—Set out from Shannopin's Town, and swam our Horses across the River Ohio, & went down the River...all the Land from Shannopin's Town is good along the River, but the Bottoms not broad; At a Distance from the River good Land for Farming, covered with small white and red Oaks and tolerable level; fine Runs for Mills &c .

== Meeting of the Virginia Commissioners, 1752 ==
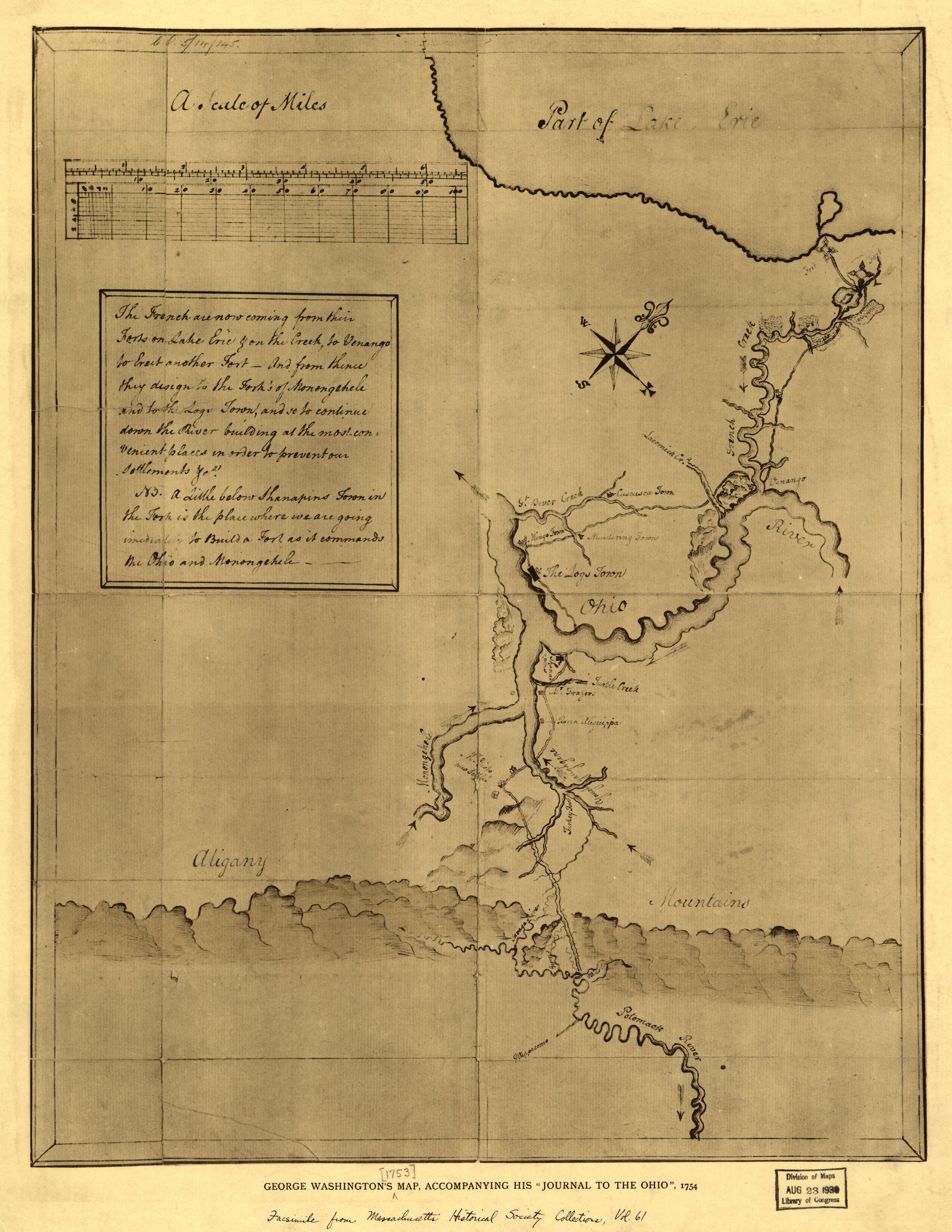
George Washington's 1754 map showing "Shanapin" at the confluence of the Ohio (now known as the Allegheny) and the Monongahela rivers

1755 map by John Mitchell showing "Shanapins" just north of Fort Duquesne, upper left of map's center

En route to the Logstown Treaty Conference, the Virginia Commissioners paused at Shannopin's Town (which they refer to as "Shonassim's Town") on May 28–30, to meet with the Lenape chiefs Shingas and Tamaqua. Shingas, who was about to be named chief of the western Lenape, may have been living at Shannopin's Town at that time, although he did not attend the conference in Logstown.

The commissioners were Colonel Joshua Fry, James Patton, and Lunsford Lomax, accompanied by Christopher Gist and Andrew Montour, who served as interpreter. The commissioners were greeted by two or three volleys of gunfire, after which they then proceeded to the river bank above the town, where they pitched camp. They spent the following day in conference with the chiefs, and noted that the Lenape had no king, but were represented by Shingas and his brother Tamaqua, both of whom, supplied with coats and hats by the commissioners, "were dressed after the English fashion." Both wore "silver Breast Plates and [had] a great deal of Wampum about them." They made favorable impressions with the commissioners, who informed the Lenape that they were to meet the Six Nations at Logstown to improve relationships between the King’s representatives and the Ohio Indians.

On 30 May the commissioners headed a short distance down river to meet with Queen Alliquippa. They reached Logstown on 31 May.

== Visit by George Washington, 1753 ==
George Washington and Christopher Gist met with Shingas at Shannopin's Town (which Washington refers to as "Shanapins") on 23 November 1753, on their way to Logstown, during Washington's journey to speak with the French commander at Fort Le Boeuf.

It was near Shannopin's Town, as he was returning from his mission to the French, December 29, 1753, that Washington almost drowned in the icy waters of the Allegheny. Washington and Gist were following "The Piney Creek", which meets the Allegheny River at current day Etna, Pennsylvania. The river had not completely frozen, so Gist and Washington had to make a raft to cross the river. As they were crossing, the raft was struck by an ice jam and Washington was thrown into the water, but managed to grab onto the raft with Gist pulling him aboard. Gist writes:

Saturday 29.— We set out early, got to Alleghany, made a raft, and with much difficulty got over to an island, a little above Shannopin's town. The Major having fallen in from off the raft, and my fingers frostbitten, and the sun down, and very cold, we contented ourselves to encamp upon that island. It was deep water between us and the shore; but the cold did us some service, for in the morning it was frozen hard enough for us to pass over on the ice.

They spent the night on Wainwright's Island, an island which has now been absorbed into the southern shore of the Allegheny River. The next day they went to the trading house of John Fraser at the mouth of Turtle Creek, staying overnight and continuing on the next day to Shannopin's Town.

in November, 1753, Lewis Montour reported to James Hamilton that Tanacharison and Scarouady were living in Shannopin's Town.

== French military landing at Shannopin's Town, 1754 ==
Map of the route General Forbes' forces took to reach Fort Duquesne in September, 1758. Shannopin's Town is indicated at the far left.

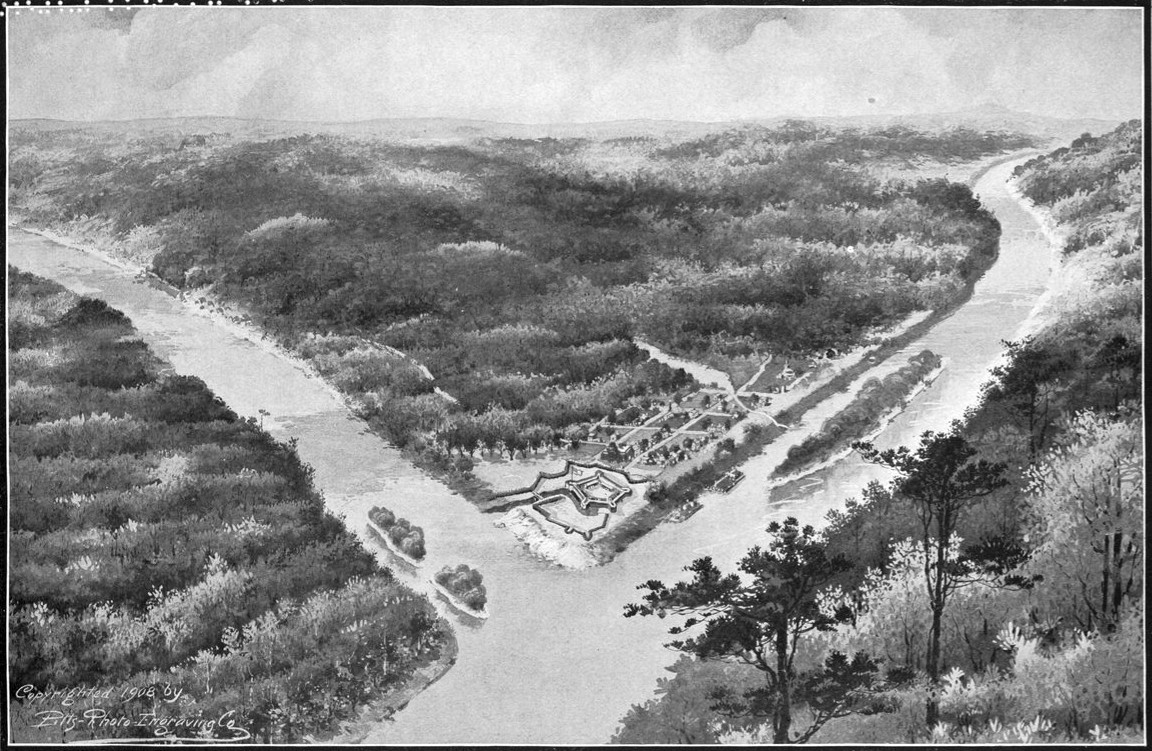
Newly-constructed Fort Pitt in 1759. The abandoned remains of Shannopin's Town can be seen on the riverbank to the far left.

In January, 1754 British soldiers under the command of William Trent began construction of Fort Prince George at the confluence of the Ohio and the Monongahela rivers, about two miles west of Shannopin's Town. On 4 March 1754, a French detachment under Michel Maray de La Chauvignerie discovered the fort, still under construction. In April, a force of more than 500 men under the command of Captain Claude-Pierre Pécaudy de Contrecœur sailed down the Allegheny River from Venango, landing at Shannopin's Town. On 18 April 1754, the French Commander sent a captain, a drummer and an interpreter to present Ensign Edward Ward, the acting commander, with a summons stating that the French Army intended to lay siege to the fort, and that the British had one hour to leave. The British garrison of about forty men withdrew, and the French seized the fort and razed it to build Fort Duquesne.

== Abandonment ==
Shannopin's Town was largely abandoned during the construction of Fort Duquesne, but a small community still existed when John Hogan, a British prisoner, observed it in August, 1756. In 1758, General Forbes' troops passed through it and observed the decapitated bodies of Scottish highlanders of the 77th Regiment of Foot (Montgomerie's Highlanders) who had been killed on 14 September at the Battle of Fort Duquesne when Major James Grant was defeated. The town had vanished by the time construction of Fort Pitt was begun in 1759.

== Archaeological investigations ==
Archaeological work in the Pittsburgh area sponsored by the Carnegie Museum of Natural History has uncovered relatively little from the 18th century, due to disturbance of sites by construction and industry. A Native American burial site was uncovered during construction on 31st Street in 1862, but no other information was recorded. Some work in the Fort Pitt area has uncovered features including circular house-hearths or fire pits, midden areas, postmolds, cellars, fence lines, remains of fortifications, stone foundations, trash pits, privies, and parts of walls. Artifacts include prehistoric and historic ceramics, debitage, glass, glass trade beads, gunflints, metal, redware, and textiles.

== See also ==
- History of Pennsylvania
- History of Pittsburgh
- French and Indian War
- Logstown
- Lenape
- Fort Pitt
