= Celeron (song) =

"Celoron" is a folk song written by Robert Schmertz to describe an expedition in June 1749. A copy of this song is part of the Robert Schmertz collection.

The expedition was led by Captain Celoron de Blainville. He had received instructions from the Comte de la Galissoniere to protect the French trading activities in lands west of the Allegheny Mountains from the British Ohio Company. Celeron led the expedition of Indians and Frenchmen to the St. Lawrence River and Montreal. From there, they traveled to Lake Ontario and the Niagara River. They continued to Lake Erie and to the upper Allegheny River. As they traveled down the Allegheny toward Pittsburgh, they deposited various lead plates that announced that the land belonged to Louis, King of France.

== Lyrics ==
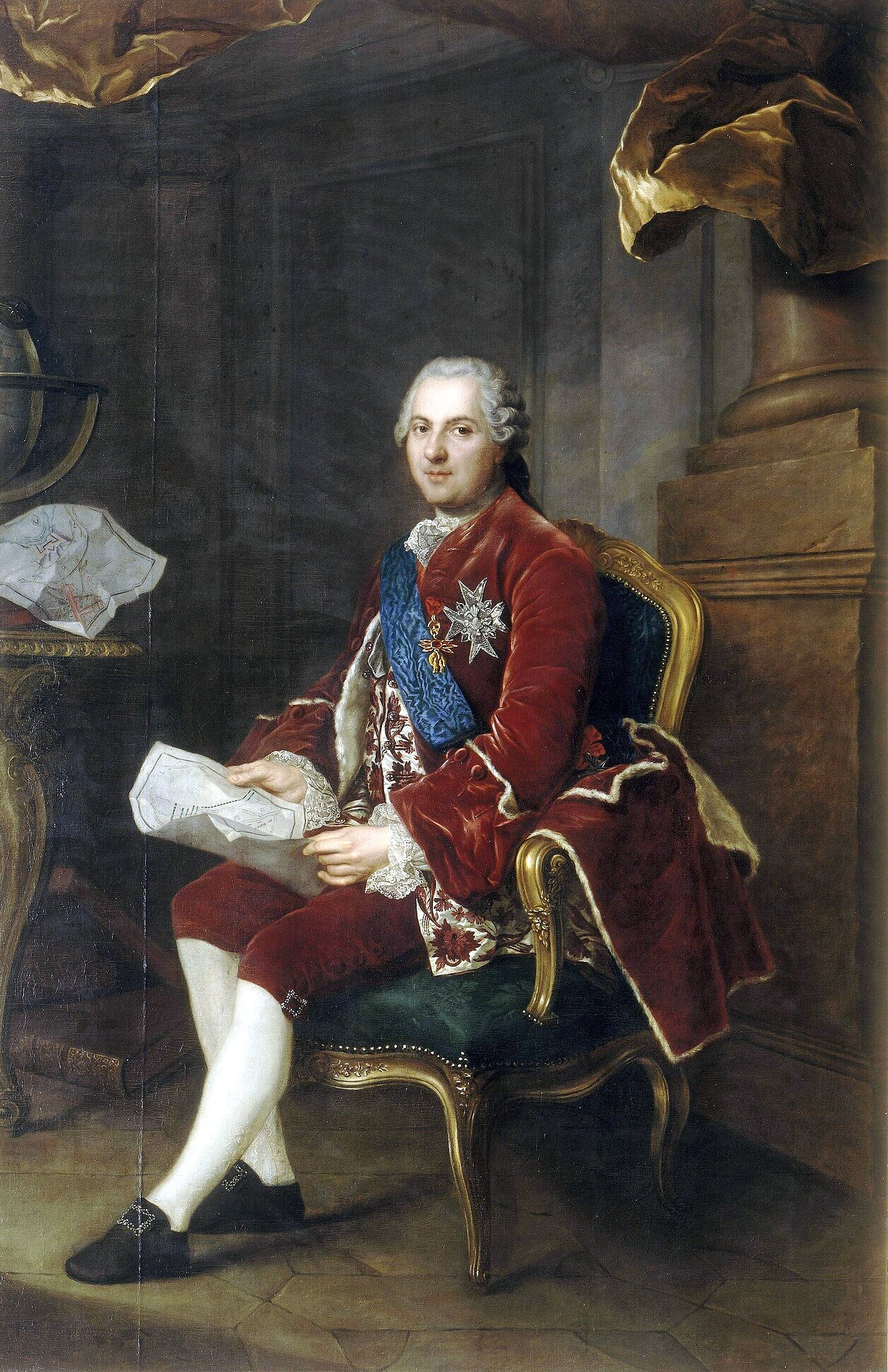
King Louis of France

CHORUS
Did you know about Celoron? No! No !
Did you know about Celoron? No! No!
Did you know about Celoron? No! No!
Did you know about Celoron? No! No!
A Frenchman brave and a Frenchman bold
A captain come from the northland cold
For to lay French claim to the 0 - hi - O!
Did you know about Celoron? No! No!

In seventeen forty-nine, oh,
Captain Celoron Gave his men a sign, oh,
on a June day dawn
Two hundred fifty Frenchmen and fifty braves also
Embarked on the St. Lawrence for Lake OntariO!

They paddled to Niagara and portaged round
the falls And skimmed along Lake Erie,
a-singing madrigals --
Across to Lake Chatauqua they portaged once again --
A thrilling sight to see Sir, the Captain and his men!

(CHORUS)

The upper Allegheny they called the 0 - hi - 0 --
And down the river valley canoe-ing they did go
Said Celoron "La Belle Riviere! Allons!
let·'s on our way!
or France and good King Louis we have a claim to lay!"

Along the river valley they laid their plates of lead
Which bore a French inscription which very boldly read
"I, Celoron de Dlainville, do claim by this advance
The land of the Ohio for Louis, King of France!"

(CHORUS)

(What a fellow was Celoron, Oh ho! --
Down past Monongahela the voyageurs did roam,
And up Miami River they paddled back for home
But soon the men of Britain came on the plates of lead --
It won't bear repetition just what the British said!

If t'weren't for Merry England, it might well have been so
That we would all be Frenchmen along the 0 - hi - 0 --
And as for captain Celoron, We've loudly sing his praise
And raise the French tri-color and sing the Marseillaise!
