= Joseph Pierre de Bonnecamps =

French Jesuit

- Born: September 7, 1708; Vannes, France
- Died: May 28, 1790 (aged 81); Château de Tronjoli, near Gourin
- Resting place: Church of Notre-Dame de Gourin
- Years active: 1743–1790
- Known for: Created the first map of the Ohio Valley

Joseph Pierre de Bonnecamps (7 September 1708 – 28 May 1790) was a French Jesuit, missionary, priest and professor and tutor.

== Biography ==
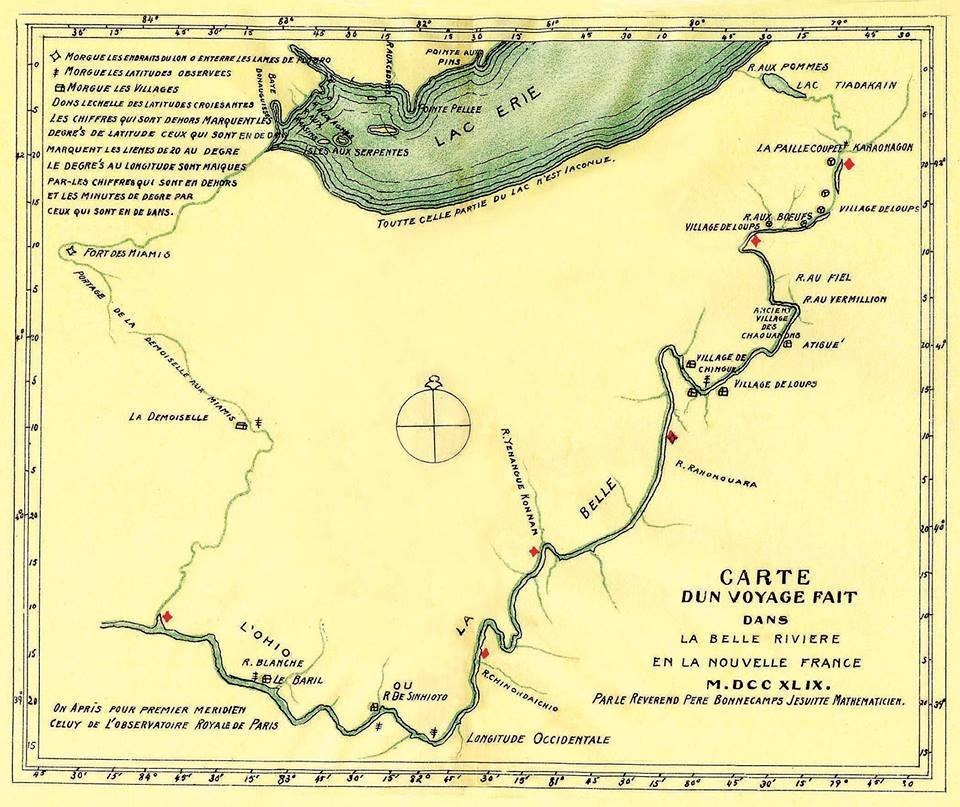
Map of the route followed by Pierre Joseph Céloron de Blainville along the Ohio River in 1749, drawn by Joseph Pierre de Bonnecamps.

Bonnecamps was born in Vannes, France. He entered the Jesuit seminary at Paris in 1727 and was ordained in 1743. He was professor of hydrography at the Collège de Québec, New France, from 1743 to 1757, during which time he was a member of the expedition of Pierre Joseph Céloron de Blainville to the Ohio Valley from June to November 1749, occupying the roles of chaplain, hydrographer and historian. He completed the first map of the Ohio Valley.

He travelled for health reasons to France in 1757—1758; the next year, he returned to New France as professor or mathematics at the Collège de Québec, then at the Collège du Mont (affiliated with the University of Caen Normandy, the building of which today houses the Normandy Antiquities Museum) in Caen from 1759 to 1760. Defrocked during the suppression of the Jesuits in France in 1762, he became a parish priest and was chaplain of Brest Prison from 1762 to 1766.

Bonnecamps was a missionary in Saint Pierre and Miquelon from 1762 to 1766. He was tutor to the children of Admiral de Tronjoli at Tronjoli Castle, near Gourin, from 1768 to 1790. He is entombed at the Church of Notre-Dame de Gourin.
