= The Miller's Three Sons =

Song

- English Folk Song
- Catalogue: Roud 138, Laws Q21
- Published: 1700s: England
- Publisher: Broadside

"The Miller's Three Sons" (Roud 138, Laws Q21) is an English folk song. It was published as a broadside in the middle of the 18th century AD, but no more recent printings are known. It was "reasonably widespread in England but hugely popular in North America".

== Synopsis ==
A miller has three "lusty" sons. On his deathbed he questions them to decide which should inherit his mill. He asks each how much flour they will take from the grain brought to the mill by farmers to be ground. The eldest says he will take one peck out of every bushel (a quarter of the total).

"Thou art a fool," the old man said.
"Thou has not well learnt thy trade"

The second son says he will take half, and gets the same reply.

The third son says:

"Before I will a good living lack, I'll take it all and foresware the sack"

In most versions the old man leaves the mill to his youngest son, and dies. In some versions there is some speculation as to his eternal destination:

Now this millers's dead and in his grave,
And hungry worms his body have;
But where he's gone to I can't tell
But I'll leave it to you to judge for yoursel'.

However in at least one version collected in Wisconsin:

The old man died without any will,
I'll be hanged if the old woman didn't keep the mill!

== Early Versions ==
=== Broadsides and early printed versions ===
The song was printed by broadcast sellers Dicey & Marshall sometime between 1736 and 1753.

=== Versions Collected from Traditional Singers ===
The Roud Folk Song Index lists about 19 versions collected from England, 7 from Scotland, 5 from Canada, and 90 from the USA (mainly from the Appalachians, Ozarks and New England).

== Recordings ==
=== Field Recordings ===
Versions by Norfolk singers Harry Cox, and Walter Pardon, Suffolk singer Jumbo Brightwell, Arkansan J.D. Stark, and Scottish singer Charles Fiddes Reid are in online archives. Jim Holbert was recorded singing "The Miller's Goin' For To Die" at an FSA camp in Visalia, California in 1940.

Jumbo Brightwell's version. The Derby Miller" is on "Troubles They Are But Few" (The Voice of the People Volume 14). Virginian Horton Barker was recorded singing "The Millers Will" in 1962., Georgia singer Dr. C.B Skelton was recorded singing "The Miller's Will" in 1993,

=== Recordings by Old-time and Country Singers ===
This song was recorded by Carson Brothers & Sprinkle as "The Old Miller's Will" in 1929, and by Bascom Lamar Lunsford as "The Miller's Will" in 1956.

=== Recordings by revival singers and groups ===
The Oldham Tinkers, Brass Monkey, The Claque, Jackie Oates, and Bella Hardy have all recorded versions.

== Discussion ==
As both Steve Roud and Roy Palmer point out, millers were suspected of taking more than their fair share or "toll" of the flour produced from the grain taken by farmers to be ground. They often had a monopoly, and were suspected of sharp practice. This unsavoury reputation goes back at least as far as Chaucer's "Canterbury Tales"; Chaucer describes his miller as stealing corn and taking three times his toll:

He was a janglere and a goliardeys,
And that was moost of synne and harlotries.
Wel koude he stelen corn and tollen thries;
And yet he hadde a thombe of gold, pardee.

— General Prologue, lines 560–563
