= Anglo-American music =

Anglo-American music is derived from the English culture of the Thirteen Colonies of the United States and has been a founding influence for American folk and popular music.

== Overview ==
Many American folk songs use the same music, but with new lyrics, often as parodies of the original material. Anglo-American songs can also be distinguished from British songs by having fewer pentatonic tunes, less prominent accompaniment (but with heavier use of drones) and more melodies in major.

Anglo-American traditional music, dating back to colonial times, includes a variety of broadside ballads, humorous stories and tall tales, and disaster songs regarding mining, shipwrecks (especially in New England) and murder. Folk heroes like Joe Magarac, John Henry and Jesse James are also part of many songs. Folk dance of English origin include the square dance, descended from the European high society quadrille, combined with the American innovation of a caller instructing the dancers. Sea shanties are an important part of Anglo-American music.

The folklorist Alan Lomax described regional differences among rural Anglo-American musicians as included the relaxed and open-voiced northern vocal style and the pinched and nasal southern style, with the west exhibiting a mix of the two. He attributed these differences to sexual relations, the presence of minorities and frontier life.

"On the Old Kissimmee Prairie"
This is a British tune from the Library of Congress' Florida Folklife from the WPA Collections; performed by Bob Hall, Walter van Bass, Ned Hugh Bass and J. C. King with banjos, guitars and violin in July, 1940 in Kenansville, Florida.

== Notes ==
1. Nettl, pg. 201
2. Nettl, pgs. 201-202
3. Burk, Meierhoffer and Phillips
4. Lomax, pg. 1, cited in Nettl, pg. 202
