= Pierre Joseph Céloron de Blainville =

French Canadian explorer

Pierre-Joseph Céloron de Blainville (29 December 1693 – 14 April 1759), also known as Celeron de Bienville (or Céleron, or Céloron, etc.), was a French Canadian Officer of Marine. In 1739 and 1740 he led a detachment to Louisiana to fight the Chickasaw in the abortive Chickasaw Campaign of 1739. In 1749 he led the "Lead Plate Expedition" to advance France's territorial claim on the Ohio Valley.

== Biography ==
Pierre Joseph Céloron de Blainville was born at Montreal on 29 December 1693. He was the son of Jean-Baptiste Céloron de Blainville and Hélène Picoté de Belestre.

Céloron entered military service in 1713. At this time the French collaborated with the Indians in pressuring the New England colonies. He was promoted to lieutenant in 1731. He was appointed lieutenant commandant to the post at Michilimackinac in 1734 (Burton, 328). He seems to have been appointed to a second term in 1737, but before the expiration of that term he was called to Louisiana. He was promoted to captain in 1738.

The British-allied Chickasaw nation, in present-day northern Mississippi, blocked communication between Upper and Lower Louisiana. Bienville, Governor of Louisiana, assembled a second grand campaign against them in 1739. In response to a call to the Canadian government for assistance, Céloron was dispatched to Fort de l'Assumption near present-day Memphis, Tennessee, with a "considerable number of Northern Indians" and a company of cadets. The assembled forces remained in place through the winter without striking the fortified villages of the Chickasaw, 120 miles to the east. But finally in March, 1740, Céloron with his corps of cadets, one hundred regulars, and four or five hundred Indians set forth. After some skirmishing the Chickasaw were found quite willing to make peace (Atkinson, 70).

After his return to Michilimackinac, Céloron was appointed to command of Detroit, at which time he was referred to as a Chevalier of the Military Order of Saint Louis and a captain in the Department of Marine. In 1744, he was appointed to command at Fort Niagara, and in 1746, Fort St. Frédéric on Lake Champlain (Burton, 327).

=== The "Lead Plate" Expedition ===
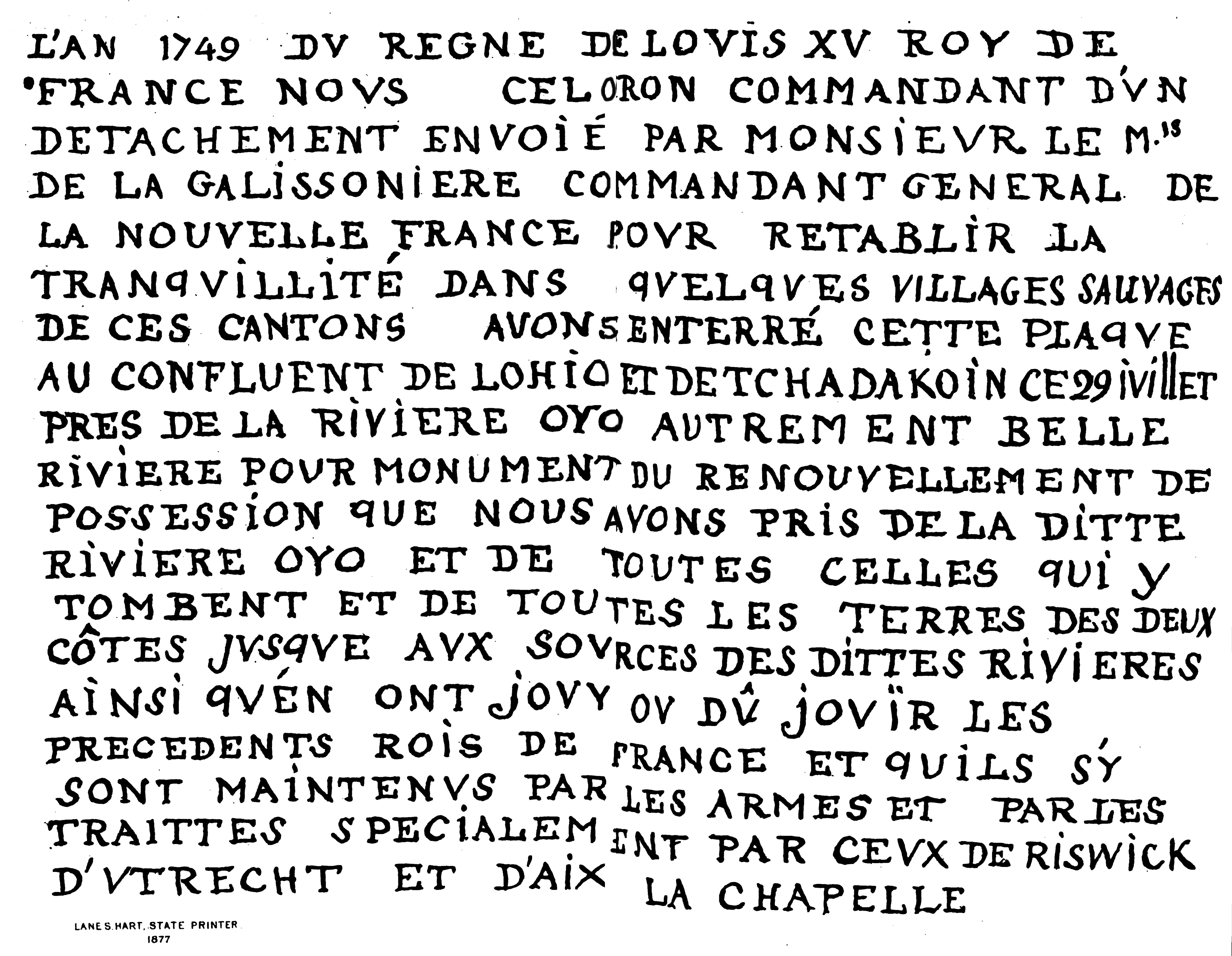
In 1749 French explorer Pierre Joseph Céloron de Blainville asserts sovereignty of France over the Ohio valley by burying a lead plaque called "of Point Pleasant". See picture.

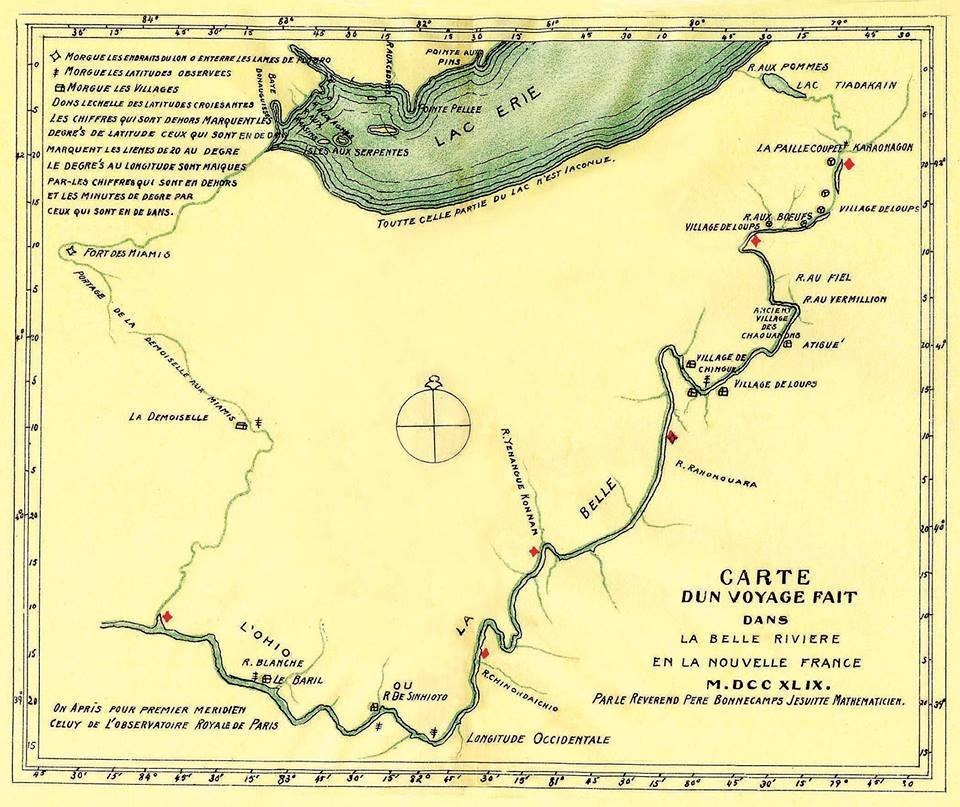
Map of the route followed by Pierre Joseph Céloron de Blainville along the Ohio River in 1749, drawn by Joseph Pierre de Bonnecamps.

From 1743 to 1748, Britain and France fought King George's War. During this war, England blockaded New France, breaking down the French fur trade. The British became the major trading partners with Native Americans in the Ohio valley.

France claimed the Ohio Valley (and indeed the entire Mississippi basin) on the basis of the explorations made by La Salle in 1669 and 1682. Great Britain claimed the Ohio Valley on the basis of purchases from Native Americans in 1744. In fact, both the colonies of Virginia and Pennsylvania had claims on the Ohio valley, although in the 1740s and 1750s, Virginia was more active in pressing her claim.

According to R. E. Banta, author of The Ohio [Rivers of America series], in May 1749, the Ohio Company of Virginia received a grant from King George, which included 200,000 acres on the south bank of the Ohio between the Monongahela and the Great Kanawha Rivers. One goal of establishing this grant was to test the willingness of the French to defend the Ohio. The grant in turn provoked the immediate dispatch of Céloron's expedition from Montreal (page 65).

In 1748, Comte de la Galissoniere, the governor of Canada, ordered Céloron to strengthen the French claim on the Ohio Valley. Céloron carried out this mission in the summer of 1749 by means of an expedition through the contested territory. He set out from Montreal on June 15, 1749, in a flotilla consisting of large boats and canoes. The expedition included 216 French Canadians and 55 Native Americans. On the shore of Lake Erie, at the mouth of Chautauqua Creek in present-day Westfield, New York, the expedition cut a road over the French Portage Road, and carried their boats and equipment overland to Chautauqua Lake, then followed the Chadakoin River and Conewango Creek to the Allegheny River, reaching it on July 29, 1749, in what is now the City of Warren, PA..

As it progressed, the expedition sought to strengthen France's claim to the territory by marking it at the mouths of several principal tributaries. At each point, a tin or copper plate bearing the French royal arms was nailed to a tree. Below, an inscribed leaden plate was buried, declaring the claims of France. This was a traditional European mode of marking territory, but it might have contributed to Native American anxieties about the intentions of the French, and thus ultimately had a counterproductive effect.

Reaching the Monongahela River, the party boated past Shannopin's Town at the current site of Pittsburgh, and down the Ohio River. They paused at Kittanning, but found the village abandoned except for a Lenape chief, whom they invited to attend a council meeting with Céloron at Logstown. At Logstown, in present-day western Pennsylvania, Céloron discovered English traders. Incensed, he evicted the traders and wrote a scolding note to the governor of Pennsylvania. He then hectored the Native Americans about French dominance of the region. This overbearing behavior offended the Iroquois in his party, some of whom returned to their homeland in present-day New York, tearing down copper plates as they went.

A plate was buried at the mouth of the Muskingum River on August 15, 1749, and the mouth of the Kanawha River on August 18, 1749. Arriving at Lower Shawneetown at the Scioto River's mouth on August 21, he again encountered English traders. Céloron summoned them to his camp on August 25 and demanded that they leave, stating that "they had no right to trade or aught else on the [Ohio] River," but most refused.

The expedition then traveled up the Great Miami River to Pickawillany, arriving there on 13 September. They spent a week camped outside the village and met briefly with the chief Memeskia, who promised to consider returning to live near Detroit as a French ally. Céloron later remarked, speaking in general about his journey, that "the nations of these localities are very badly disposed towards the French, and are entirely devoted to the English."

Five months after the expedition began, it returned to Montreal, arriving November 10, 1749. Céloron's journal is archived at Archives of the Department de la Marine, Paris, France (Galbreath, 12).

In total, Céloron buried at least six lead plates. One was stolen by curious Indians almost immediately, possibly before it was even buried, and placed in British hands. Two more were found in the early 19th Century. Measuring about eleven inches long and seven and one-half inches wide, each lead plate was marked with an inscription as follows (Galbreath, 110–111):

L'AN 1749 DV REGNE DE LOVIS XV ROY DE
FRANCE, NOVS CÉLORON, COMMANDANT D'VN
DETACHEMENT ENVOIE PAR MONSIEVR LE MIS.
DE LA GALISSONIERE, COMMANDANT GENERAL DE
LA NOUVELLE FRANCE POVR RETABLIR LA
TRANQUILLITE DANS QUELQUES VILLAGES SAUVAGES
DE CES CANTONS, AVONS ENTERRE CETTE PLAQUE
AU CONFLUENT DE L'OHIO ET DE TCHADAKOIN CE 29 JVILLET,
PRES DE LA RIVIERE OYO AUTREMENT BELLE
RIVIERE, POUR MONUMENT DU RENOUVELLEMENT DE
POSSESSION QUE NOUS AVONS PRIS DE LA DITTE
RIVIERE OYO, ET DE TOUTES CELLES QUI Y
TOMBENT, et de TOUTES LES TERRES DES DEUX
COTES JVSQVE AVX SOURCES DES DITTES RIVIERES
AINSI QV'EN ONT JOVY OU DÛ JOVIR LES
PRECEDENTS ROIS DE FRANCE, ET QU'ILS S'Y
SONT MAINTENVS PAR LES ARMES ET PAR LES
TRAITTES, SPECIALEMENT PAR CEVX DE RISWICK
D'VTRECHT ET D'AIX LA CHAPELLE.

— CÉLORON, Plaque de Renouvellement de possession
Translation:

In the year 1749, of the reign of Louis the 15th, King of
France, we Céloron, commander of a detachment sent by
Monsieur the Marquis de la Galissoniere, Governor General of
New France, to reestablish tranquility in some Indian villages of
these cantons, have buried this Plate of Lead at the confluence
of the Ohio and the Chadakoin, this 29th day of July, near the
river Ohio, otherwise Belle Riviere, as a monument of the renewal
of the possession we have taken of the said river Ohio
and of all those which empty into it, and of all the lands on
both sides as far as the sources of the said rivers, as enjoyed
or ought to have been enjoyed by the kings of France preceding
and as they have there maintained themselves by arms and by
treaties, especially those of Ryswick, Utrecht and Aix-la-Chapelle.

The French continued to press their claim to the Ohio Valley, and colonial friction with the British finally contributed to outbreak of the Seven Years' War.

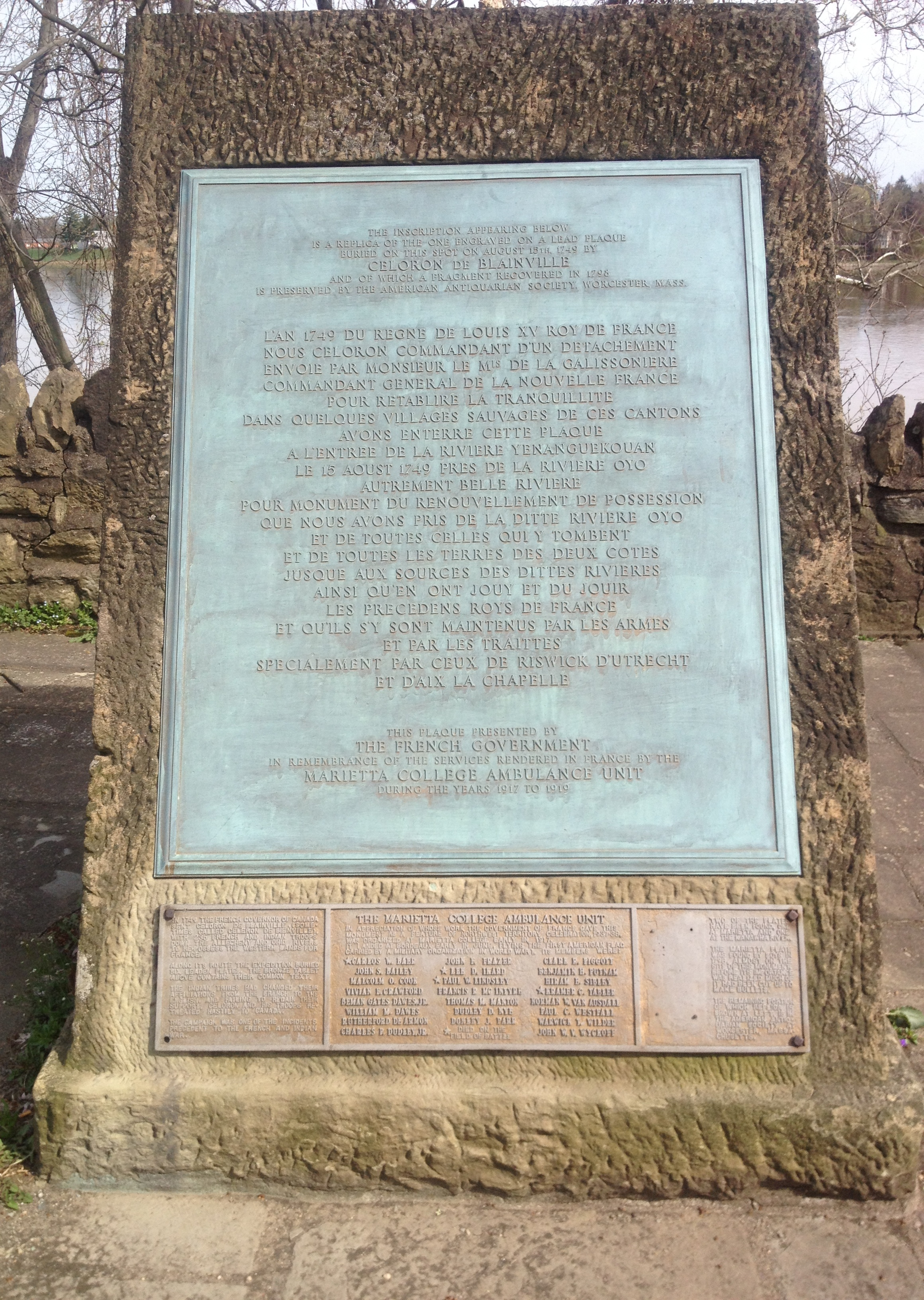
The French monument in Marietta, Ohio.

=== Last years and death ===
Upon his return, Céloron was reappointed to the important post at Detroit, and in 1753, was promoted to Major and appointed to Montreal. He died at Montreal on April 14, 1759 (Burton, 332).

== Family ==
Céloron had three children by his first wife, Marie Madeline Blondeau, married December 30. 1724. His second wife was Catherine Eury de la Parelle, married in Montreal on October 13, 1743, and with whom he enjoyed nine children (Burton, 327).

== See also ==
- Céloron de Blainville
- Celoron, New York
- Shannopin's Town
- Kuskusky
- Logstown
- Kittanning (village)
- Lower Shawneetown
- Pickawillany
- Joseph Pierre de Bonnecamps

== Sources ==
- Atkinson, James R. (2004). Splendid Land, Splendid People. University of Alabama Press. OCLC 0817350330. pp. 62–73
- Burton, C. M. (1905). Detroit's Rulers, in Historical Collections of the Michigan Pioneer and Historical Society, Vol. XXXIV. Wynkoop Hallenbeck Crawford Co. OCLC 8069520. Chapter on Céloron, pp. 327–333
- Galbreath, Charles (1921). Expedition of Céloron to the Ohio country in 1749. F. J. Heer Printing Co. OCLC 1898004. Céloron's Ohio Expedition journal and other accounts
- Crumrine, Boyd (1999) [1882]. History of Washington County, Pennsylvania. L. H. Everts and Co. ISBN 1-58103-594-2. Account of Céloron at Logstown, pg. 26
- Hildreth, S. P.: Pioneer History: Being an Account of the First Examinations of the Ohio Valley, and the Early Settlement of the Northwest Territory, H. W. Derby and Co., Cincinnati, Ohio (1848) pp. 18–24.
- Andrew Arnold Lambing, translator. "Celeron's Journal." In Expedition of Céloron to the Ohio Country in 1749. Edited by Charles B. Galbreath. Columbus, Ohio: F. J. Heer Printing Company, 1921. Pages 12 to 77.
- Marshall, O. H. "De Céloron's Expedition to the Ohio in 1749." Magazine of American History II (3) (1878): 127–150. [ Marshall, who in 1878 wrote the first complete account of Céloron's journey, is credited with discovering the explorer's journals in the 1850s in the archives of the Department de la Marine and Grandes Archives of the Depot de la Marine in Paris.]
