= Robert Schmertz (artist) =

American architect and musician (1898–1975)

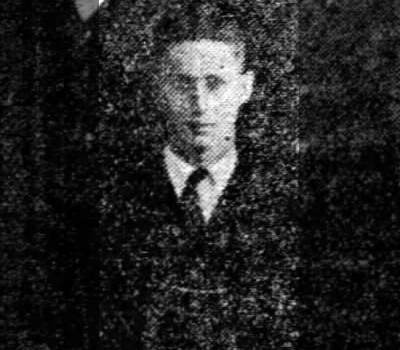
- Schmertz, c. 1919
- Born: Robert Watson Schmertz; March 4, 1898; Squirrel Hill, Pittsburgh, Pennsylvania, U.S.
- Died: June 7, 1975 (aged 77)
- Other name: Bob
- Occupations: Architect, folk musician
- Notable work: Sing Oh! The City Oh!: Songs of Early Pittsburgh
- Spouse: Mildred Floyd
- Children: 4

Robert Watson Schmertz (March 4, 1898 – June 7, 1975) was a Pittsburgh-based architect and folk musician whose music has been covered by Pete Seeger, Burl Ives, Tennessee Ernie Ford, Bill and Gloria Gaither, The Statler Brothers, The Cathedrals, Dailey & Vincent, the River City Brass Band, and Ernie Haase & Signature Sound. Born in Squirrel Hill, Pittsburgh, Pennsylvania, Schmertz attended the Carnegie Institute of Technology, where he wrote the Carnegie Tartans' fight song, "Fight for the Glory of Carnegie," and played the banjo in a jazz orchestra; after he graduated with an architecture degree in 1921, Schmertz designed buildings. He taught at Carnegie for more than thirty-five years before his retirement.

As a folk musician, Schmertz released four albums, with his third, Sing Oh! The City Oh!: Songs of Early Pittsburgh, in commemoration of the 200th anniversary of Pittsburgh's founding; a reviewer for Keystone Folklore Quarterly called it "tuneful and well-done in the folk tradition". Before his death, Schmertz completed a book of his songs, but died before it published. Ten days after he suffered a stroke, Schmertz died on June 7, 1975.

== Early life ==
Schmertz was born on March 4, 1898, in Squirrel Hill, Pittsburgh, Pennsylvania. After he completed studies at Peabody High School, where he met his future wife, Mildred, Schmertz attended the Carnegie Institute of Technology (today, Carnegie Mellon University). In May 1917 Schmertz, dressed in "light flannel trousers, a girl's middy blouse and a small white hat," was arrested after he stood outside a theater and encouraged persons exiting the theater to join the navy as, according to Schmertz, a part of an initiation ritual to join a fraternity; he was charged with mocking the uniform but a magistrate later dismissed the charge.

At Carnegie, Schmertz wrote the Carnegie Tartans' fight song, "Fight for the Glory of Carnegie", wrote college musicals, led a dance band, played the banjo in a jazz orchestra, and worked on the Carnegie yearbook staff. In 1921, he graduated with a degree in architecture.

== Architecture and professorship ==
As an architect, Schmertz designed the St. Michael's of the Valley Church in Rector, Pennsylvania, and the renovation of the Unity Chapel in Latrobe, Pennsylvania. In 1930, the Common Brick Manufacturers' Association of America in Cleveland, Ohio, awarded Schmertz an honorable mention in a "houses already built" contest. Three years later, Schmertz served on a Pittsburgh-based American Institute of Architects executive committee that sought to identify western Pennsylvanian buildings constructed before 1860. Schmertz worked as a member of Fisher and Schmertz, and, later, headed the firm of Schmertz, Erwin and Associates. According to George Swetnam of The Western Pennsylvania Historical Magazine, "many" of the buildings Schmertz designed were homes.

Schmertz taught design at the Carnegie Institute of Technology for more than thirty-five years. At Carnegie, Schmertz worked on a team that designed a cyclotron for the university in Saxonburg, Pennsylvania. Schmertz retired from his professorship in 1965 (named a professor emeritus), but was teaching at the university in 1973.

== Folk musician ==
In 1949, Schmertz, who played the banjo in college, recorded an LP, Songs by Robert Schmertz, after his friends bought him studio time. Schmertz's second studio album, Robert Schmertz Sings His Songs, was released in 1955: from the album, Burl Ives covered "Angus McFergus McTavish Dundee" on the Captain Kangaroo show.

By 1958, a writer for the Deadwood Pioneer-Times in Deadwood, South Dakota, wrote that Schmertz was "rapidly gaining national prominence as an interpreter of American musical and lyrical idiom" after Schmertz wrote a song, "Swing Away, Pearly Gates," for Edmund Karlsrud and the Concertmen, who performed it as a part of their 1957–1958 tour. In 1958, composer Elie Seigmeister and lyricist Edward Mabley cited Schmertz's "Monongahela Sal" and "Lock No. Ten" as inspiration for The Mermaid in Lock No. 7, a musical "in the folk idiom, expanded by modern, sophisticated treatment" that debuted at the American Wind Symphony Orchestra.

Schmertz's third album, Sing Oh! the City Oh!: Songs of Early Pittsburgh, released on Folkways Records in 1959, featured folk songs, such as "Celeron", named after Pierre Joseph Céloron de Blainville, and "The Battle of Bushy Run", after the battle of the same name, in commemoration of the bicentennial of Pittsburgh's founding. A reviewer for Keystone Folklore Quarterly described the album, to which two of his children, Gretchen Schmertz Jacob and John Schmertz, contributed, as "tuneful and well-done in the folk tradition". A reviewer for Billboard magazine called it a "fascinating package of songs" that "will appeal to folklorists, educational groups, and, of course, residents of Pittsburgh particularly". Schmertz released his final album, Ladies Beware of an Architect: Songs for Architects and Their Girlfriends, in 1960.

Schmertz's music has been covered by Pete Seeger, who called Schmertz a "very good songwriter", Burl Ives, Tennessee Ernie Ford, Bill and Gloria Gaither, The Statler Brothers, The Cathedrals, Dailey & Vincent, the River City Brass Band, and Ernie Haase & Signature Sound.

== Later life ==
In 1970, Schmertz retired from his position at Schmertz, Erwin and Associates. In 1973, he resided in Ben Avon, Pennsylvania. With his wife, Mildred Floyd, an art teacher, Schmertz had four children: Gretchen Schmertz Jacob, John, Jack, and Mildred.

Before his death, Schmertz compiled a book on his songs, though he died before it published. Ten days prior to his death, Schmertz sustained a stroke, and, on June 7, 1975, died after a long illness.
