= Unity, Kentucky =

Unincorporated community in Kentucky, United States

Coordinates: 38°25′43″N 82°37′49″W

- Unincorporated community
- Interactive map of Unity, Kentucky
- Country: United States
- State: Kentucky
- County: Boyd
- Time zone: UTC-6 (Central (CST))
  - Summer (DST): UTC-5 (CDT)
- GNIS feature ID: 2085038

Unity, Kentucky is a small unincorporated community and former coal mining community that formerly had a U.S. Post Office located two miles west of Catlettsburg. Kentucky Route 168 passes through the hamlet. Catletts Creek, a tributary of the Ohio River, runs through the community of Unity. Unity was served by the Catletts Creek School, later named Eidson Elementary, from 1962 to 1993, when all students were transferred to Catlettsburg Elementary. The hamlet of Unity is virtually non-existent today, as most residents of Unity refer to Catlettsburg as their home, since it is the postal zip code used.
