= Kentucky Route 5 =

State highway in Kentucky

Kentucky Route 5
- KY 5 highlighted in red

Route information
- Maintained by KYTC
- Length: 11.573 mi (18.625 km)

Major junctions
- South end: US 60 in Princess
- North end: US 23 in Westwood

Location
- Country: United States
- State: Kentucky
- Counties: Boyd, Greenup

Highway system
- Kentucky State Highway System; Interstate; US; State; Parkways
← KY 4	→ KY 6

Kentucky Route 5 (KY 5) is an 11.573-mile-long (18.625 km) north–south state highway in eastern Kentucky.

== Route description ==
KY 5 begins at a junction with U.S. Route 60 at Princess, Kentucky in Boyd County. The route continues through Bellefonte in Greenup County to terminate at U.S. Route 23 back in Boyd County in between Ashland and Russell.

== Major intersections ==
County	Location	mi	km	Destinations	Notes
Boyd	Princess	0.000	0.000	US 60	Southern terminus
Boyd		3.763	6.056	KY 503 north	Southern terminus of KY 503
Boyd		4.794	7.715	KY 3293 east	Western terminus of KY 3293
Boyd	Summit	6.862	11.043	KY 716 south	Northern terminus of KY 716
Boyd		7.578	12.196	KY 766 east	Western terminus of KY 766
Boyd		9.104	14.651	KY 1458 north	Southern terminus of KY 1458
Greenup	Bellefonte	10.405	16.745	KY 1093 north (Country Club Drive)	Southern terminus of KY 1093
Boyd	Westwood	11.573	18.625	US 23	Northern terminus
1.000 mi = 1.609 km; 1.000 km = 0.621 mi
