= Arliss Beach =

American football player (born 1984)

No. 32, 33
- Position: Running back

Personal information
- Born: March 28, 1984 (age 42); Louisville, Kentucky, U.S.
- Listed height: 6 ft 0 in (1.83 m)
- Listed weight: 220 lb (100 kg)

Career information
- High school: Ashland (KY) Blazer
- College: Kentucky
- NFL draft: 2006: undrafted

Career history
- Green Bay Packers (2006); Dallas Cowboys (2007)*; Houston Texans (2007–2008)*
- * Offseason or practice squad member only

Arliss Beach (born March 28, 1984) is an American former football running back. He was signed by the Green Bay Packers as an undrafted free agent in 2006. He played college football at Kentucky.

Beach was also a member of the Dallas Cowboys and Houston Texans.

== Early life ==
Although born in Louisville, Beach grew up in the Ashland area, attending school in the adjacent Fairview school district up until the seventh grade, when he moved to the Ashland city district. He graduated from the city district's Paul G. Blazer High School, where he set several school records in football, and was the only athlete in Kentucky to be elected All-State in both football and basketball during the years in which he played. He also lived with his mother Kerry Beach. And his other two Siblings Adrian and Andrea Beach. His grandfather Elzie Thomas pastored a church in Ashland known as Christ Temple of the Pentecost faith. His mother also pastored a church. He was raised in church.

== College career ==
After the end of Beach's senior year in high school, the University of Kentucky offered him a full scholarship to play football. While enrolled, the football program went through major staff and coaching changes, and it has been said that this is the reason Beach was never handled correctly.

== Professional career ==
=== Green Bay Packers ===
Beach signed with the Green Bay Packers as an undrafted free agent on May 3, 2006, and was immediately placed on the active roster after impressing the coaching staff. He suffered a serious ankle injury during the preseason, however, and thus he was placed on injured reserve for the 2006 season on September 6. He was released by Green Bay on June 15, 2007.

=== Dallas Cowboys ===
On August 23, the Dallas Cowboys signed Beach to a free agent contract, trying to fill a void left by injured running back Jackie Battle. Beach was released by Dallas on September 1 prior to the regular season.

=== Houston Texans ===
Beach was signed to the practice squad of the Houston Texans on December 26, 2007. He was then re-signed to a future contract in January 2008, but was waived by the team on May 22.

Beach was re-signed to the Texans' practice squad after running back Darius Walker was promoted to the active roster. The Texans released Beach from the practice squad on September 24, 2008.
