= Kavanaugh, Kentucky =

Unincorporated community in Kentucky, United States

- Unincorporated community
- Location within the state of Kentucky Kavanaugh, Kentucky (the United States)
- Coordinates: 38°15′12″N 82°35′13″W
- Country: United States
- State: Kentucky
- County: Boyd
- Elevation: 574 ft (175 m)
- Time zone: UTC-5 (Eastern (EST))
  - Summer (DST): UTC-4 (EDT)
- ZIP code: 41129
- GNIS feature ID: 508370

Kavanaugh, Kentucky is an unincorporated community located in Boyd County, Kentucky, located along U.S. Route 23 directly north of the Lawrence County line. In 1984, the original alignment of U.S. 23 was replaced with a modern four-lane highway. CSX Transportation's Big Sandy Subdivision railroad tracks pass through the community. The railroad was formerly operated by the Chessie System and its predecessor the Chesapeake and Ohio Railway Company.

The community is named after the historic Kavanaugh Chapel United Methodist Church and cemetery which has been a local landmark there since it was formed in 1866. The white church building was built as a proper replacement for the original log church house in 1873 which set on the same site where the church now stands. The Kavanaugh School was held in the same log cabin as the church for many years. The church was named in honor of Bishop Hubbard Hinde Kavanaugh, a Methodist Episcopal Bishop in office at the time the church was formed. The Kavanaugh school operated to the left of the chapel and cemetery until the mid-1950s when it closed due to being part of a major consolidation program of the Boyd County School System. A United States Post Office was operated there as Kavanaugh, Ky. from 1901 to 1910.

The community immediately to the north of Kavanaugh, Burnaugh, took its name from a combination of Kavanaugh and the nearby Burgess Station. Burnaugh is sometimes applied to both communities as they adjoin each other and are essentially one and the same. However, local residents strictly refer to the area from the church south to the county line as Kavanaugh, and the community north of the church Burnaugh. The church site is considered the dividing line between the two communities. Kavanaugh is located within the ZIP Code Tabulation Area for zip code 41129, which includes the county seat, Catlettsburg.
