= Coalton, Kentucky =

Unincorporated community in Kentucky, United States

Coalton
- Unincorporated community
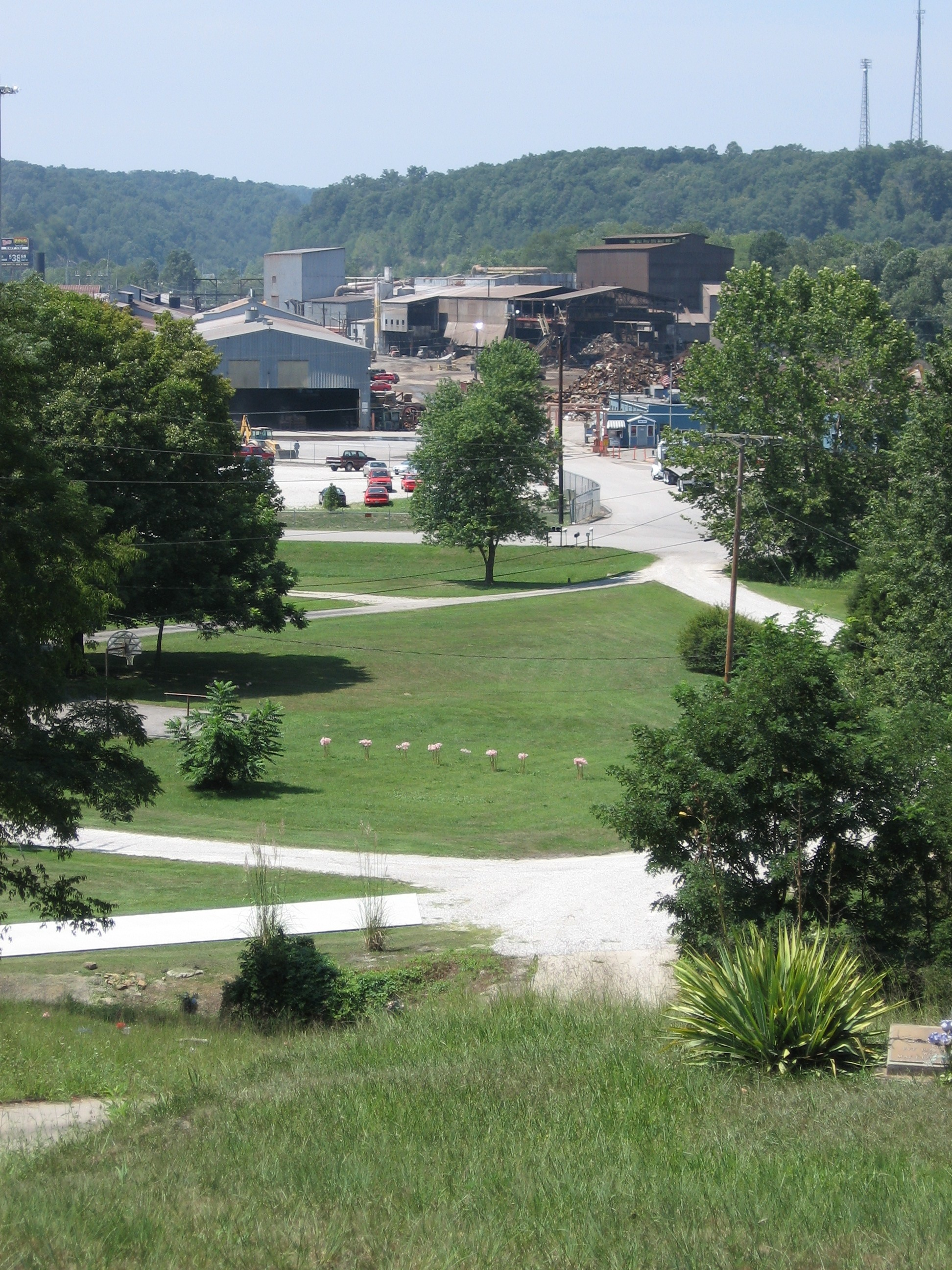
- View from Coalton Community Cemetery

- Location within the state of Kentucky Coalton (the United States)
- Coordinates: 38°22′12″N 82°46′09″W
- Country: United States
- State: Kentucky
- County: Boyd

Population (2000)
  - Total: 288,649
- Time zone: UTC-5 (Eastern (EST))
  - Summer (DST): UTC-4 (EDT)
- GNIS feature ID: 489742

Coalton is an unincorporated community situated along U.S. Route 60, which was formerly known as the Midland Trail (before 1925) in western Boyd County, Kentucky, United States. U.S. Route 60 between Rush and Cannonsburg. Coalton is a part of the Huntington-Ashland Metropolitan Statistical Area (MSA). As of the 2010 census, the MSA had a population of 287,702. New definitions from February 28, 2013, placed the population at 361,500. Coalton is located within both the Ashland and Rush postal ZIP codes.

== Points of interest ==
The Boyd County Fair Grounds are located in Coalton. Kentucky Electric Steel (KES Acquisitions), which employs 118 union steelworkers, is located at Coalton. The Hyland Company, has a dog food production plant located on U.S. Route 60. Hanson Brick operates a brick manufacturing facility here.

== Transportation ==
US 60 interchanges with Interstate 64 in Coalton. This is one of three interchanges located in Boyd County. CSX Transportation, formerly Chesapeake and Ohio Railway, operates a spur line from Ashland to Coalton. This spur allows garbage to be delivered to the Big Run Landfill in neighboring Princess by rail from the CSX mainline in Ashland and also allows Steel Dynamics and the Hanson Brick Plant to transport their goods back to the CSX mainline.

== Education ==
- Boyd County Public Schools
