= Special Metals Corporation =

American supplier of special refractory alloys

- Special Metals Corporation
- Industry: Alloy metals
- Predecessors: Inco Alloys International, Henry Wiggin & Company, Huntington Alloys
- Founded: 1998; 28 years ago
- Products: Inconel, Incoloy, Monel, Nimonic, Udimet
- Owner: Berkshire Hathaway (since 2016)
- Number of employees: 590 (1997)
- Parent: Precision Castparts Corp. (since 2006)
- Website: specialmetals.com

Special Metals Corporation (SMC) is an American supplier of special refractory alloys and is headquartered in New Hartford, New York, United States. The company has operations in Perth, Western Australia; Albury, New South Wales; Huntington, West Virginia; Dunkirk, New York; Burnaugh, Kentucky; Elkhart, Indiana and Hereford, England.

SMC's trademarks include Inconel, Incoloy, Monel, Nimonic, and Udimet.

== History ==
"In 1952, a predecessor of Special Metals pioneered the melting technology that led to the practical development of the superalloys that are the critical materials used in the 'hot' section of modern jet engines."

At year end of 1996, SMC had "45 million pounds of vacuum induction melting capacity", 590 employees, was incorporated in Delaware and was managed by Don Muzyka.

SMC acquired Inco Alloys International from Inco in 1998 at the same time as it sold US$125 million of preferred stock to Titanium Metals Corporation.

In 2006, Special Metals was acquired by Precision Castparts Corp. of Portland, Oregon, US.

SMC is now ultimately owned by Berkshire Hathaway as a result of the latter company's acquisition of Precision Castparts in January 2016.
