= Meads, Kentucky =

Unincorporated community in Kentucky, United States

Meads
- Unincorporated community
- Location within the state of Kentucky Meads (the United States)
- Coordinates: 38°24′45″N 82°42′33″W
- Country: United States
- State: Kentucky
- County: Boyd
- Time zone: UTC-5 (Eastern (EST))
  - Summer (DST): UTC-4 (EDT)

Meads is an unincorporated community in Boyd County, Kentucky, United States. It is located along the U.S. Highway 60 corridor south of Ashland.

Meads is centered on the junction of U.S. Route 60, Kentucky Route 538 and Mead-Springer Road. It was named for the long closed Mead's station, a train station and general store located on the C&O(now CSX) railroad that still runs through the community. Very little if anything remains of the original community besides the railroad and a few homes. With the upgrading of U.S. 60 beginning in the early 1970s, new growth began to happen at Meads, as it was reborn as a suburb of Ashland. In 1974 a large subdivision named Rockdale was developed on the hills above Meads, with several hundred tract homes. In 1991, Mead Station Plaza was constructed with over 20 commercial units and serves the nearby communities along U.S. 60. Several other commercial units have followed suit in recent years. Meads is a part of the Huntington-Ashland Metropolitan Statistical Area (MSA). As of the 2010 census, the MSA had a population of 287,702. New definitions from February 28, 2013, placed the population at 363,000.
