= Lockwood, Kentucky =

Unincorporated community in Kentucky, United States

- Unincorporated community
- Location within the state of Kentucky Lockwood, Kentucky (the United States)
- Coordinates: 38°18′30″N 82°34′49″W
- Country: United States
- State: Kentucky
- County: Boyd
- Elevation: 574 ft (175 m)
- Time zone: UTC-5 (Eastern (EST))
  - Summer (DST): UTC-4 (EDT)
- ZIP code: 41129
- GNIS feature ID: 508483

Lockwood is an unincorporated community located along U.S. Route 23 and the Big Sandy River in southern Boyd County, Kentucky, United States, approximately 7 mi south of Catlettsburg, the county seat.

The community's first post office was established in 1860 and was named for Jacob Lockwood, the first postmaster and landowner whose father-in-law was pioneer David White, who had deeded the land to him in 1809. The original post office was closed in 1865. In 1881, Jacob's grandson, John Lockwood, re-established a post office at this location as Staley, Kentucky, when the train station along the Chatteroi (now CSX) Railroad opened. He changed the name of the station and post office back to Lockwood in 1892. It finally closed in 1933.

A major regional highway, U.S. Route 23 was first moved in 1964 to the pike that runs through Lockwood from its original 1927 alignment from Catlettsburg to Louisa along the present-day Kentucky Route 3. In 1987, a modern four-lane replacement was opened for U.S. 23 that also runs through the Lockwood community.

Lockwood Estates Subdivision and Park, a large middle-class housing development with a small recreational park, began development in 1971 by Overland Development, Inc. at Lockwood. Still using the Lockwood name for which the area is known, the subdivision has kept the name in common usage by locals.

Today, Lockwood is located within the ZIP Code Tabulation Area for ZIP code 41129, which includes the city of Catlettsburg.
