= Eliana Fu =

British materials scientist

Eliana Koon Yee Fu
- Education: Imperial College London; Queen Mary University of London
- Scientific career
- Workplaces: SpaceX; Loughborough University; Clemson University; Titanium Metals Corporation
- Thesis: Production of titanium aluminides by powder metallurgy (1998)

Eliana Koon Yee Fu is a British materials scientist and innovator. She works as an aerospace and medical manager at Trumpf Laser Technology. In 2022, she was named the TCT Women in 3D Printing Innovator of the Year.

== Early life and education ==
Fu is from London. As a young person, she had never heard of materials science. She was given a leaflet by someone at Queen Mary University of London and so she decided to study it as an undergraduate degree. She moved to Imperial College London for her doctoral research, where she studied titanium aluminides using powder metallurgy. She moved to Loughborough University for a postdoctoral position, before moving to the United States. She was a postdoctoral fellow at Clemson University. She has said that she had a cultural shock moving to South Carolina as she was used to living in London. She joined an engineering company in Rotherham, where she worked in a traditional forge shop.

== Research and career ==
In 2007, Fu joined the Titanium Metals Corporation (TIMET), a titanium manufacturer, where she worked in manufacturing. In 2015, she moved to Los Angeles to work for SpaceX. She was made an advisor to Eric Garcetti committee on advanced materials manufacturing.

Eventually in 2018, she joined Relativity Space, where she worked on additive manufacturing for novel rockets. At the time, it was the only company in the world that focused on 3D printing an entire rocket. She was their first woman engineer.

In 2021, Fu was recruited by Trumpf Laser Technology to serve as their Industry Manager for Aerospace and Medical. She focused on sustainability in manufacturing, and the development of green laser technologies for 3D printing. That year she joined the technical advisory board of Hyperion Metals (now called IperionX). In 2022 she was named the TCT Women in 3D Printing Innovator of the Year.

== Personal life ==
Fu was a former amateur triathlete, and once cycled on a fun ride with Chrissie Wellington. During her working life at TIMET, she participated in the city of Las Vegas Corporate Challenge, which was a program designed to promote health and wellness in Clark County. She won numerous gold, silver and bronze medals in a variety of events including 5K run, 12 mile bike ride, swimming, tug of war and even Darts. She wrote a book about being a woman working at SpaceX.

Fu is a life-long fan of Tottenham Hotspur Football Club and has made numerous appearances as a fan-contributor to Premier League Productions “Fanzone” program with opinions on performance and predictions.
