= Durban (disambiguation) =

Durban is a city in KwaZulu-Natal province of South Africa.

Durban may also refer to:

== Places ==
- Durban, Gers, France, a commune
- Durban, Manitoba, Canada, an unincorporated community
- Aggijjat, Nunavut, Canada, formerly named Durban Island
- Roman Catholic Archdiocese of Durban
- Durban railway station, Durban, South Africa

== People ==
- Alan Durban (born 1941), Welsh footballer and manager
- Arne Durban (1912–1993), Norwegian sculptor and art critic
- Pam Durban (born 1947), American novelist and short story writer

== Other uses ==
- HMS Durban, a Royal Navy light cruiser
- Naval Base Durban, a South African Navy base
- World Conference against Racism 2001, also known as Durban I
  - Durban Review Conference, a successor conference also known as Durban II
  - Durban III, a 2011 United Nations General Assembly meeting marking the 10th anniversary of the adoption of The Durban Declaration and Programme of Action

== See also ==
- Benjamin D'Urban (1777–1849), British general and colonial administrator, namesake of the city
- D'Urban Armstrong (1897–1918), South African First World War flying ace
- Durbans, France, a commune
- Durbin (disambiguation)
- Turban (disambiguation)
