= Kentucky Route 766 =

State highway in Kentucky, United States

Kentucky Route 766

Route information
- Maintained by KYTC
- Length: 2.044 mi (3.289 km)

Major junctions
- West end: KY 5 in Ironville
- East end: US 60 in Ironville

Location
- Country: United States
- State: Kentucky
- Counties: Boyd

Highway system
- Kentucky State Highway System; Interstate; US; State; Parkways

Kentucky Route 766 (KY 766) is a state maintained highway located near Ashland, Kentucky, in the United States. It is used as a connector route between KY 5 and U.S. Route 60 (US 60) and runs for a distance of two miles (3.2 km). It is the primary route through the unincorporated community of Ironville, which is a suburb of Ashland.

== Route description ==
KY 766 begins at an intersection with KY 5 on the west side of Ironville. It heads east along Donta Road. Near Roberts Road, Donta Road curves to the south and then back to the north where it intersects KY 1134. KY 766 switches back onto Roberts Drive and heads south. Shortly thereafter, it turns east onto Bob McCullough Drive, while KY 3292 continues south on Roberts Drive. The street heads southeast for a short way before it ends at US 60.

== Major intersections ==
The entire route is in Ironville, Boyd County.

mi	km	Destinations	Notes
0.000	0.000	KY 5	Western terminus
1.261	2.029	KY 1134 east (Roberts Drive)	Western terminus of KY 1134
1.550	2.494	KY 3292 south (Roberts Drive)	Northern terminus of KY 3292
2.044	3.289	US 60 / Raybourne Road	Eastern terminus
1.000 mi = 1.609 km; 1.000 km = 0.621 mi
