= Garner, Kentucky =

Garner, Kentucky may refer to the following places in the U.S. state of Kentucky:

- Garner, Boyd County, Kentucky
- Garner, Knott County, Kentucky
