= Fairview High School (Kentucky) =

Coordinates: 38°28′47″N 82°40′29″W

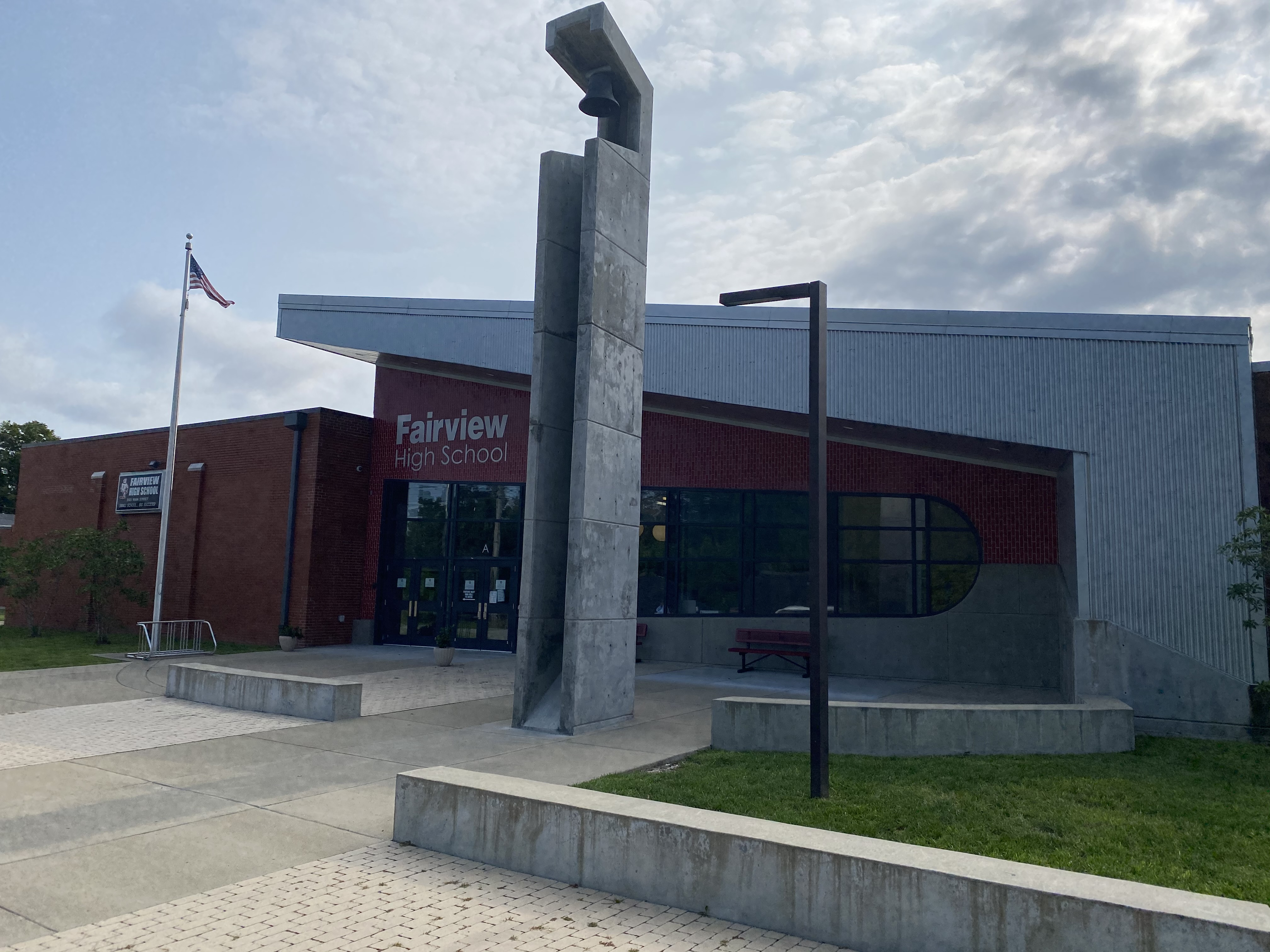

Location
- 2123 Main Street; Westwood, Kentucky 41102; United States

Information
- Type: Public
- School district: Fairview Independent Schools
- Principal: Charles Clark
- Staff: 27.72 (FTE)
- Grades: 7 to 12
- Enrollment: 299 (2023–2024)
- Student to teacher ratio: 10.79
- Colors: Red, black and white
- Mascot: Woody the Eagle
- Team name: Eagles
- Website: Official Site

Fairview High School is a public high school in Westwood, Boyd County, Kentucky, United States, a census-designated place closely affiliated with Ashland, Kentucky. It is part of the Fairview Independent Schools.

== Academics ==
Fairview High School offers academic classes for reading and writing in the English language, basic mathematics, general science, general social studies, physical education, and career education for students in grades 6–8. Fairview High School also offers academic classes for reading and writing in the English language, reading and writing in the Spanish language, algebra, geometry, trigonometry, chemistry, biology, forensics, anatomy, United States history, United States government, geography, concert choir, art, humanities, marketing, career education, and advanced physical education for students in grades 9–12.

Fairview High School's academic instruction is regulated by the Kentucky Department of Education. As of the 2014–2015 school year, Fairview High School earned a "Needs Improvement" classification for middle school instruction (grades 6–8) and a "Distinguished" classification for high school instruction (grades 9–12).

== Extracurricular activities ==
=== Athletics ===
Fairview High School's athletics are governed by the Kentucky High School Athletic Association. The mascot of Fairview High School is an eagle. Athletics at the institution are broken down into three categories (fall, winter, and spring), and are further broken down into three subcategories (boys, girls, and co-ed). In the fall, Fairview's boys have an American football team and a golf team, Fairview's girls have a golf team and a volleyball team, and Fairview has a co-ed cross country team. In the winter, Fairview's boys have a basketball team, and Fairview's girls have a basketball team. In the spring, Fairview's boys have a baseball team and a track and field team, and Fairview's girls have a softball team and a track and field team. The school's athletic department previously included a swimming team. Fairview also has archery, bowling, and cheerleading.

=== Co-curricular activities ===
As of the 2019–2020 school year, Fairview High School had an academic team, a Pep Band, Pep club, a choir, a speech and drama club, a yearbook club, a National Honor Society chapter, a Junior National Honor Society chapter, a Future Business Leaders of America club, a Fellowship of Christian Athletes club, a Spanish Club, a Senior Salute, and a Spirit Club.

== Notable alumni ==
- Chris Jennings, former running back for the New York Jets of the National Football League.
- Steve Kazee, Broadway and film actor, known for his work in Broadway's Spamalot and for originating the role of Guy in the musical Once (musical).
