= Paul G. Blazer High School =

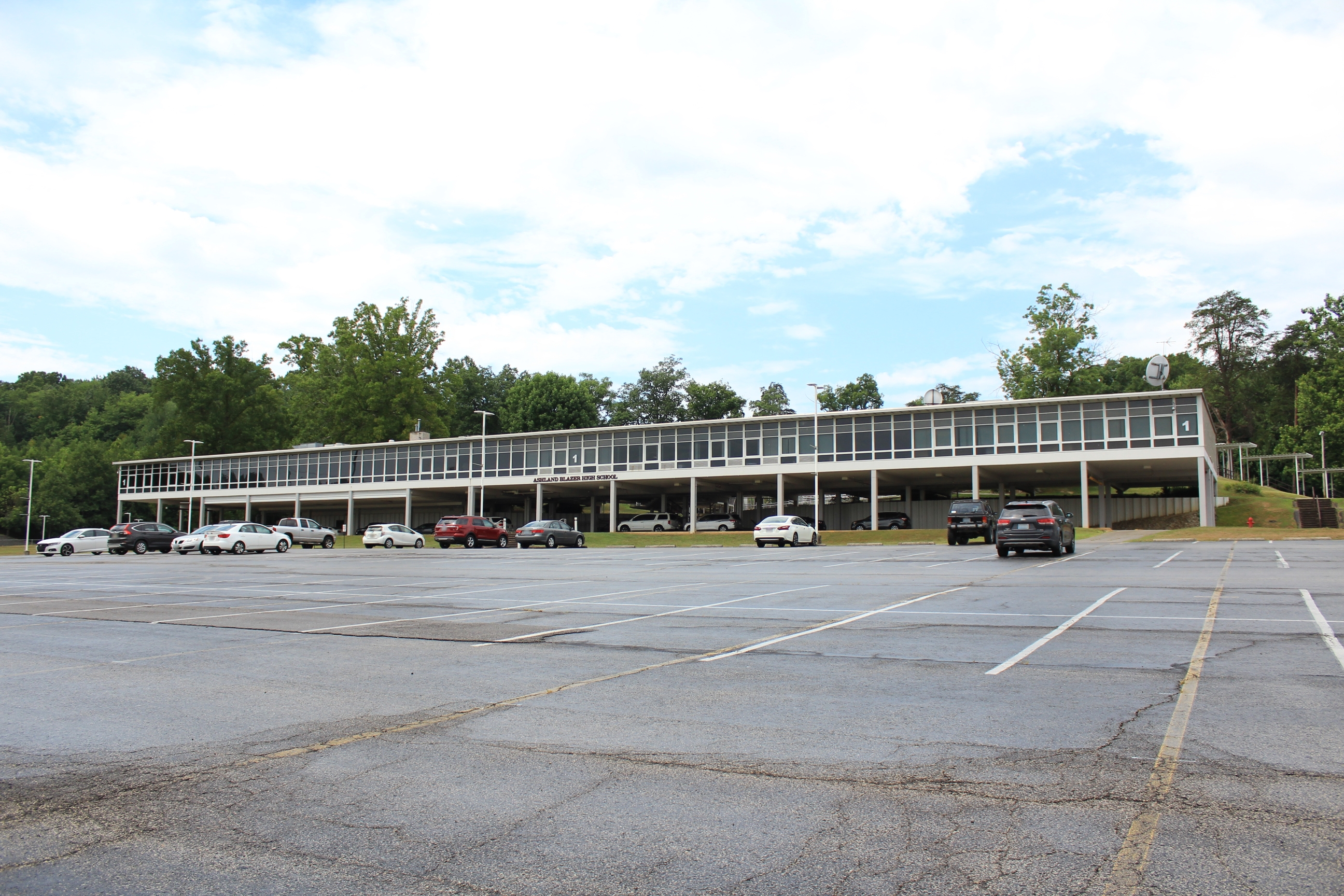
- Front of the high school campus

Location
- 1500 Blazer Boulevard; Ashland, Kentucky 41102; United States; 38.4544°N 82.6639°W

Information
- Type: Public high school
- Established: 1962
- School district: Ashland Independent School District
- Superintendent: Sean Howard
- NCES School ID: 210015000022
- Principal: Jamie Campbell
- Teaching staff: 65.00 (on an FTE basis)
- Grades: 9–12
- Enrollment: 879 (2023-2024)
- Student to teacher ratio: 13.52
- Colors: Maroon and White
- Fight song: "On, On Ashland High" ("On, On U of K")
- Mascot: Tomcats (boys), Kittens (girls)
- Website: blazer.ashland.kyschools.us

Paul G. Blazer High School is a public high school in Ashland, Kentucky, United States. It was named for Paul G. Blazer and is part of the Ashland Independent School District. It replaced the former Ashland High School on Lexington Avenue and the former Booker T. Washington Grade and High School at Seventh Street and Central Avenue in 1962. It is designed in a campus-style layout with seven buildings which is unique among high schools in the region, as most consist of a single building.

== Notable alumni ==
- Arliss Beach — National Football League player
- Larry Conley — professional basketball player
- Drew Hall — former Major League Baseball pitcher
- Ashley Judd — actress and political activist(attended)
- Wynonna Judd — country singer
- Megan Neyer - American springboard and platform diver, member of 1980 US Olympic team; 8 time NCAA Champion; 15 time US National Champion
- Charlie Reliford, Major League Baseball umpire
- Harold Sergent — former basketball player
- Robert Smedley — professional wrestler, author
- Brandon Webb — former Major League Baseball player, 2006 National League and 2006 Cy Young Award
- Chuck Woolery — game show host, talk show host, and musician
