= Kentucky Route 716 =

State highway in Kentucky, United States

Kentucky Route 716

Route information
- Maintained by KYTC
- Length: 1.565 mi (2.519 km)

Major junctions
- South end: US 60 in Summit
- North end: KY 5 in Summit

Location
- Country: United States
- State: Kentucky
- Counties: Boyd

Highway system
- Kentucky State Highway System; Interstate; US; State; Parkways
← KY 715	→ KY 717

Kentucky Route 716 (KY 716) is a 1.565-mile-long (2.519 km), north–south highway running through Summit in Boyd County.

== Route description ==
KY 716 begins at the intersection of Little Garner Road and U.S. Route 60 (US 60) in Summit. It heads west along Little Garner Road for one-half mile (0.80 km), where it intersects KY 3293 and Summit Road. It turns north onto Summit Road, which it stays on for the rest of its route. The road passes the Federal Correctional Institution, Ashland. Just short of a railroad crossing, it intersects Roberts Road, which carries KY 3292. KY 716 crosses the railroad tracks and continues north. The route ends at KY 5.

== Major intersections ==
The entire route is in Summit, Boyd County.

mi	km	Destinations	Notes
0.000	0.000	US 60	Southern terminus
0.565	0.909	KY 3293 west / Summit Road	Eastern terminus of KY 3293
1.050	1.690	KY 3292 north (Roberts Drive)	Southern terminus of KY 3292
1.565	2.519	KY 5 / Medcalf Road	Northern terminus
1.000 mi = 1.609 km; 1.000 km = 0.621 mi
