= Titanium metals =

Titanium metals may mean:

- Titanium, chemical element, atomic number 22
- Titanium alloy, metallic material used most notably in aircraft production
- Titanium Metals Corporation
