= Princess, Kentucky =

Unincorporated community in Kentucky, United States

Princess
- Unincorporated community
- Location within the state of Kentucky Princess (the United States)
- Coordinates: 38°23′15″N 82°44′45″W
- Country: United States
- State: Kentucky
- County: Boyd
- Time zone: UTC-5 (Eastern (EST))
  - Summer (DST): UTC-4 (EDT)
- ZIP codes: 41102
- GNIS feature ID: 501349

Princess is a small unincorporated community in Boyd County, Kentucky, United States.

== Location ==
Princess is located along Kentucky Route 5, near the intersection of U.S. Route 60 and Kentucky Route 5 (GPS 38.387494,-82.745017). Princess ends at or near the top of Princess Hill (GPS 38.387343,-82.734724). Princess Hill is located on US 60 between the community of Princess and the unincorporated community of Cannonsburg. Princess runs southwest from Princess Hill along US 60 and ends when the unincorporated community of Coalton is encountered (GPS 38.381322,-82.749798). And Princess runs along Kentucky Route 5 to the confluence of Straight Creek and William's Creek (near the intersection of Kentucky Route 5 and Straight Creek Road - GPS 38.400427,-82.760516).

Princess is located within an Ashland postal zip code (41102). Princess is a part of the Huntington-Ashland, WV-KY-OH, Metropolitan Statistical Area (MSA). As of the 2000 census, the MSA had a population of 288,649.

== History ==
The community is named after a late 19th-century iron furnace called "Princess", said to have been the pet name of a daughter of a furnace official. Initially the community may have been called "Princess Furnace".

An imposing brown sandstone retaining wall of the Princess Furnace facility (GPS 38.394084,-82.758883) remains, but the actual Princess iron furnace was dismantled and relocated to Glen Wilton, Virginia (Botetourt County) in 1883–1884.

This sandstone wall is located along Kentucky Route 5 approximately 0.98 miles from US 60 and just west of where Kentucky Route 5 crosses William's Creek. There is a Kentucky Historical marker (#1135) for Princess Furnace near the sandstone retaining wall along Kentucky Route 5. The actual furnace was very near this wall, since the furnace was loaded from its top with raw materials via a catwalk from the hill retained by the sandstone wall.

The iron ore used in Princess Furnace was mined locally and shallow ore diggings gouged along the faces of the local hills are still visible.

The population focus and activity of the community has steadily shifted to near the intersection of Kentucky Route 5 and US 60.

Much of this shift can likely be attributed to the industrial brick factory (GPS 38.38244,-82.746195), now largely dismantled, near Kentucky Route 5 and US 60. This brickyard facility maintained many "company" houses near the facility for employees. A few of these company houses remained until the early 1990s, but all are now gone and the land is now privately owned. And most recently, there has been continued development of the subdivision "Princeland" (GPS 38.383668,-82.749993) and commercial / industrial developments at the Paul Coffey Industrial Park (GPS 38.39344,-82.739543); both are very near this KY 5 / US 60 intersection focus.

A railroad runs parallel to US 60 in the Princess area with a tunnel that goes under Princess Hill. At one point this was a major rail line of the C & O running from Ashland, Kentucky to Louisville, Kentucky, but now it is only a spur line that terminates at the steel mill in Coalton, the unincorporated community adjacent to Princess.

== Points of interest ==
- Old Greg's House
- Princess Chapel Church (Est. August 23, 1913)

== Education ==
Boyd County Public Schools
