= Ironville, Kentucky =

Unincorporated community in Kentucky, United States

Ironville
- Unincorporated community
- Location within the state of Kentucky Ironville (the United States)
- Coordinates: 38°27′23″N 82°41′33″W
- Country: United States
- State: Kentucky
- County: Boyd

Area
  - Unincorporated community: 0.78 sq mi (2.02 km^{2})
  - Land: 0.78 sq mi (2.01 km^{2})
  - Water: 0 sq mi (0.00 km^{2})

Population (2020)
  - Unincorporated community: 782
  - Density: 1,006/sq mi (388.4/km^{2})
  - Metro: 288,649
- Time zone: UTC-5 (Eastern (EST))
  - Summer (DST): UTC-4 (EDT)
- ZIP codes: 41102
- FIPS code: 21-39592
- GNIS feature ID: 495012

Ironville is an unincorporated community in Boyd County, Kentucky, United States, near the intersection of Kentucky Route 5 and Kentucky Route 766. Due to its proximity to Ashland, Ironville is often considered to be a part of Ashland, although officially it is separate from the city and serves as a suburb to the city. It shares its ZIP code with Ashland as well. As of the 2020 census, Ironville had a population of 782.

Ironville is a part of the Huntington-Ashland, WV-KY-OH, Metropolitan Statistical Area (MSA).

== Demographics ==
Historical population
Census	Pop.	Note	%±
2020	782		—
U.S. Decennial Census

== Education ==
Boyd County Public Schools
