= Kentucky Route 538 =

State highway in Kentucky, United States

Kentucky Route 538
- Shopes Creek Road, Lake Bonita Road
- KY 538 highlighted in red

Route information
- Maintained by KYTC
- Length: 6.631 mi (10.672 km)

Major junctions
- West end: US 60 / Meade Springer Road near Rockdale
- East end: US 23 near Catlettsburg

Location
- Country: United States
- State: Kentucky
- Counties: Boyd

Highway system
- Kentucky State Highway System; Interstate; US; State; Parkways
| ← KY 537 | → KY 539 |

Kentucky Route 538 (KY 538) is a 6.631-mile-long (10.672 km) state highway in Boyd County, Kentucky that runs from U.S. Route 60 and Meade Springer Road west of Rockdale to U.S. Route 23 south of Catlettsburg via Rockdale.

== Major intersections ==
The entire route is in Boyd County.

| Location | mi | km | Destinations | Notes |
|---|---|---|---|---|
| | 0.000 | 0.000 | US 60 / Meade Springer Road | Western terminus; continues as Meade Springer Road beyond US 60 |
| | 3.219 | 5.180 | KY 3294 (Cemetery Road) | |
| | 6.631 | 10.672 | US 23 (Louisa Road) | Eastern terminus |
1.000 mi = 1.609 km; 1.000 km = 0.621 mi
