= Turban (disambiguation) =

A turban is a type of headwear consisting of cloth wound around the wearer's head.

Turban may also refer to:

== Places ==
- Turban Geyser, geyser in the Upper Geyser Basin of Yellowstone National Park in the United States

== People ==
People with the surname Turban include:

- Dietlinde Turban (born 1957), German actress
- Marko Turban (born 1967), Estonian high jumper

== Animals ==
- Cidaris, a genus of echinoderm
- Turbinidae or Turban snails, a family of sea snails

== Plants ==
- Turban lily, common name for various species of lily
- Turban squash, type of squash closely related to the buttercup squash

== Other uses ==
- Radical 50 (巾), the "turban" or "scarf" radical in the Kangxi Dictionary system of classifying Chinese characters
- Turban Head eagle, American gold coin
- Turban helmet, a Turkish helmet
- The Turbans, an American doo-wop group

== See also ==
- Turbin, a surname
- Durban (disambiguation)
- Turbine
