= England Hill, Kentucky =

Unincorporated community in Kentucky, United States

England Hill
- Unincorporated community
- Location within the state of Kentucky England Hill (the United States)
- Coordinates: 38°23′29″N 82°36′18″W
- Country: United States
- State: Kentucky
- County: Boyd
- Elevation: 591 ft (180 m)
- Time zone: UTC-6 (Central (CST))
  - Summer (DST): UTC-5 (CST)
- GNIS feature ID: 2088733

England Hill is an unincorporated community located on the west shore of the Big Sandy River and along Paddle Creek in Boyd County, Kentucky, USA, adjacent to the southern city limits of Catlettsburg on U.S. Route 23 and historic Mayo Trail. Mayo Trail was previously U.S. 23 until the current alignment which bypasses the community was completed in 1963.

England Hill is closely associated with the city of Catlettsburg and has fought annexation by Catlettsburg numerous times over the years. The area known as England Hill is served by the England Hill Volunteer Fire Department, founded in 1977. It has the Catlettsburg, Kentucky zip code. The subdivision known as Hyland Heights was developed on a portion of the former Hyland Dairy Farm after the business was sold to Johnson Dairy Co. in the 1960s. The lands of the former dairy farm were subdivided and sold in lots during the 1960s and 1970s.

Transplants who moved from Catlettsburg due to the modernization/widening projects that were completed on U.S. Route 23 during that time. The England Hill School, later renamed Cooper School, served residents in K-8, then K-6 for many years in Hyland Heights. Cooper School was open for 26 years, from 1962 to 1988, when students were transferred to the nearby Catlettsburg or Durbin elementary schools depending on the location of their homes.

England Hill is a suburb of Catlettsburg, and has fought annexation into the city many times, most notably in 1987, when Catlettsburg tried to annex England Hill and all areas north of I-64.
