= Normal, Kentucky =

Unincorporated community in Kentucky, United States

Normal
- Unincorporated community
- Location within the state of Kentucky Normal (the United States)
- Coordinates: 38°26′37″N 82°36′45″W
- Country: United States
- State: Kentucky
- County: Boyd
- Elevation: 564 ft (172 m)
- Time zone: UTC-5 (Eastern (EST))
  - Summer (DST): UTC-4 (EST)
- GNIS feature ID: 499521

Normal is a residential unincorporated community, located within the city of Ashland, Kentucky along U.S. Route 23 and U.S. Route 60 and the Ohio River. It was annexed by the City of Ashland in 1905. Previously, Normal was an independent community with post office. Normal Presbyterian Church, founded in 1890, is one of the last surviving remnants of the original community of Normal. The originally wooden church was razed in 1957 when the current brick structure was completed across 44th Street.

Normal was named after the Eastern Kentucky Normal School, a teachers school that was opened here in 1867, by Mrs Mordecai Williams, wife of the original landowner of the community. Mordecai Williams was an Iron master who owned 600 acres of land of the present day area of Normal, from Cliffside Branch to Haney Branch at the Catlettsburg city limits. His stately residence is still standing at Normal, a brick mansion of Colonial style, located on U.S. Routes 23 and 60 at the Catlettsburg-Ashland City Limits. Williams wife operated the Normal School from the home from 1878 to 1889. It is one of the oldest homes in the entire area and has long served as landmark to the community.

Most residential zones in this section of the city have been transferred to commercial and industrial zones. Cintas Corporation operates a large facility in the former Washington Avenue section located east of the CSX railroad tracks. The community originally grew up around the coke plant built and operated by Semet Solvay and later owned by Armco/AK steel. The Normal coke plant was in operation from 1891 until it was finally closed due to its inability to comply with U.S. Environmental Protection Agency regulations in July 2011. The only concentrations of residential dwellings remaining in Normal are along Blackburn Avenue (also known as 45th Street), Daniels Street, and from Chestnut Avenue south to the Catlettsburg city limits, which is also known as Williams Addition.
