= Cannonsburg, Kentucky =

Census-designated place in the United States

- Census-designated place
- Location within the state of Kentucky
- Coordinates: 38°23′19″N 82°42′10″W
- Country: United States
- State: Kentucky
- County: Boyd

Area
  - Total: 1.75 sq mi (4.52 km^{2})
  - Land: 1.75 sq mi (4.52 km^{2})
  - Water: 0 sq mi (0.00 km^{2})
- Elevation: 605 ft (184 m)

Population (2020)
  - Total: 862
  - Density: 494/sq mi (190.9/km^{2})
- Time zone: UTC-5 (Eastern (EST))
  - Summer (DST): UTC-4 (EDT)
- FIPS code: 21-12610

Cannonsburg is a census-designated place (CDP) in Boyd County, Kentucky, United States. As of the 2020 census, Cannonsburg had a population of 862. Cannonsburg is located 8 miles (13 km) southwest of the city of Ashland, a major urban center in northeastern Kentucky. Most of Cannonsburg shares its ZIP code with Ashland; however, parts are within the Catlettsburg ZIP code. The Cannonsburg post office closed in 1929. Cannonsburg is a part of the Huntington-Ashland Metropolitan Statistical Area (MSA). As of the 2010 census, the MSA had a population of 287,702. New definitions from February 28, 2013, placed the population at 363,000.

== Geography ==
According to the U.S. Census Bureau, the Cannonsburg CDP has a total area of 1.7 square miles (4.5 km^{2}), all land. It is located in the valley of the East Fork Little Sandy River at an elevation of 605 feet (184 m) above sea level.

== Demographics ==
Historical population
Census	Pop.	Note	%±
2020	862		—
U.S. Decennial Census

== Education ==
Boyd County High School and Cannonsburg Elementary School are located in Cannonsburg. Both are a part of the Boyd County Public School District.

== Health ==
Cannonsburg is served by Bellefonte Primary & Urgent Care (12470 U.S. Route 60). Formerly Bellefonte Primary Care, the facility added urgent care services in 2009.

== Transportation ==
Cannonsburg acts as one of three access points for Interstate 64 (Kentucky), connecting the Ashland area to Lexington, Kentucky, and Huntington, West Virginia, via U.S. Route 60 and Kentucky Route 180. Ashland's other access points are through Catlettsburg via U.S. Route 23 (Kentucky), and Coalton via a two-lane section of US 60.

=== Improvements ===
Interstate 64's Exit 185 was completed at KY 180 in 1965. KY 180 was replaced with a new four-lane section from its junction with US 60 to just north of I-64 in 1977. KY 180 formerly curved to the right just north of the intersection with I-64, then followed what is now KY 3291 past Boyd County High School to Cannonsburg Road, where it merged onto that road until its terminus at US 60.

The construction of a new diamond-shaped interchange at the Interstate 64/KY 180 Exit 185 was completed in fall of 2008 to improve safety and address traffic problems. It was the site of up to one accident per week before improvements were made. Previously KY 180 was two lanes south of the interchange and four lanes north of it, with one southbound lane turning into the I-64 West merging ramp, with a separate turning lane just to the south. The southern areas are now 3-lane.

=== Broadcasting ===
WONS AM 1080's (Formally WOKT & WYHY) transmitter and tower is located on Lester Lane & East Johnson Road. It has been in operation since 1987 and is currently a Christian Talk formatted radio station. The station is owned by Fowler Media and studios are located in South Point, Ohio.

== Commerce ==
The Camp Landing Entertainment District (formerly Cedar Knoll Galleria, then Kyova Mall) is located in Cannonsburg. In May 2007, Phoenix Theaters opened a ten-screen stadium seating theater in hopes of reviving the mall, then known as Kyova Mall. Following the theater's opening, several new restaurants opened at the mall, though eventually the closing of various anchor stores (Sears and Elder-Beerman) and the COVID-19 pandemic ultimately closed the mall in 2020, save for the Rural King anchor and the theater. The property was sold in 2021 to a consortium that included the Boyd County Government and reopened as Camp Landing Entertainment District that year. New anchor tenants, including a remodeled theater, a casino, and an indoor amusement park, refilled the mall in the following years.
