= Kentucky Route 168 =

State highway in Kentucky, United States

Kentucky Route 168

Route information
- Maintained by KYTC
- Length: 8.179 mi (13.163 km)

Major junctions
- South end: US 23 / US 60 in Catlettsburg
- US 60 in Ashland
- North end: US 23 in Westwood

Location
- Country: United States
- State: Kentucky
- Counties: Boyd

Highway system
- Kentucky State Highway System; Interstate; US; State; Parkways
← KY 167	→ I-169

Kentucky Route 168 is a two-lane route extending from US 23 in Westwood to the US 23/60 multiplex in Catlettsburg. Its southern end point in Catlettsburg was originally at the underpass where Walnut and Louisa Streets once split. In 1971, the former ending was truncated to its present location due to the re-routing of U.S. 23 around downtown Catlettsburg. Once inside the city of Ashland, it traverses three different surface streets known as Valley View Drive, Blackburn Avenue and South Belmont Street via a series of turns, mainly within the South Ashland residential district. In Ashland, it crosses 13th Street (US 60) at an intersection locally known as Community.

== Route description ==
KY 168 begins at an intersection with US 23/US 60 in Catlettsburg, heading west on two-lane undivided Paul F. Purvis Road. The route heads through forested areas with sparse development, curving northwest before winding to the north. The road becomes Catletts Creek Road before it enters Ashland and continues northwest as Valley View Drive. KY 168 passes through more forests before heading north into wooded residential neighborhoods and intersecting the northern terminus of KY 1012. The route turns west onto Blackburn Avenue and passes more homes, curving northwest and passing a few businesses. The road continues through residential and commercial areas as it comes to an intersection with US 60. KY 168 continues north through more of Ashland before curving northwest and crossing a CSX railroad line, at which point it heads into Westwood and becomes Wheatley Road. The route passes through residential and commercial areas, turning northeast onto Hoods Creek Pike. KY 168 heads through wooded areas with some development and comes to its northern terminus at US 23.

== Major intersections ==
The entire route is in Boyd County.

Location	mi	km	Destinations	Notes
Catlettsburg	0.000	0.000	US 23 / US 60 (Walnut Street)	
Ashland	3.871	6.230	KY 1012 south (South Belmont Street)	
Ashland	5.804	9.341	US 60 (13th Street)	
Westwood	8.179	13.163	US 23 (Russell Road)	
1.000 mi = 1.609 km; 1.000 km = 0.621 mi

== See also ==
- Roads of Ashland, Kentucky
