= Rush, Kentucky =

Unincorporated community in Kentucky, United States

- Unincorporated community
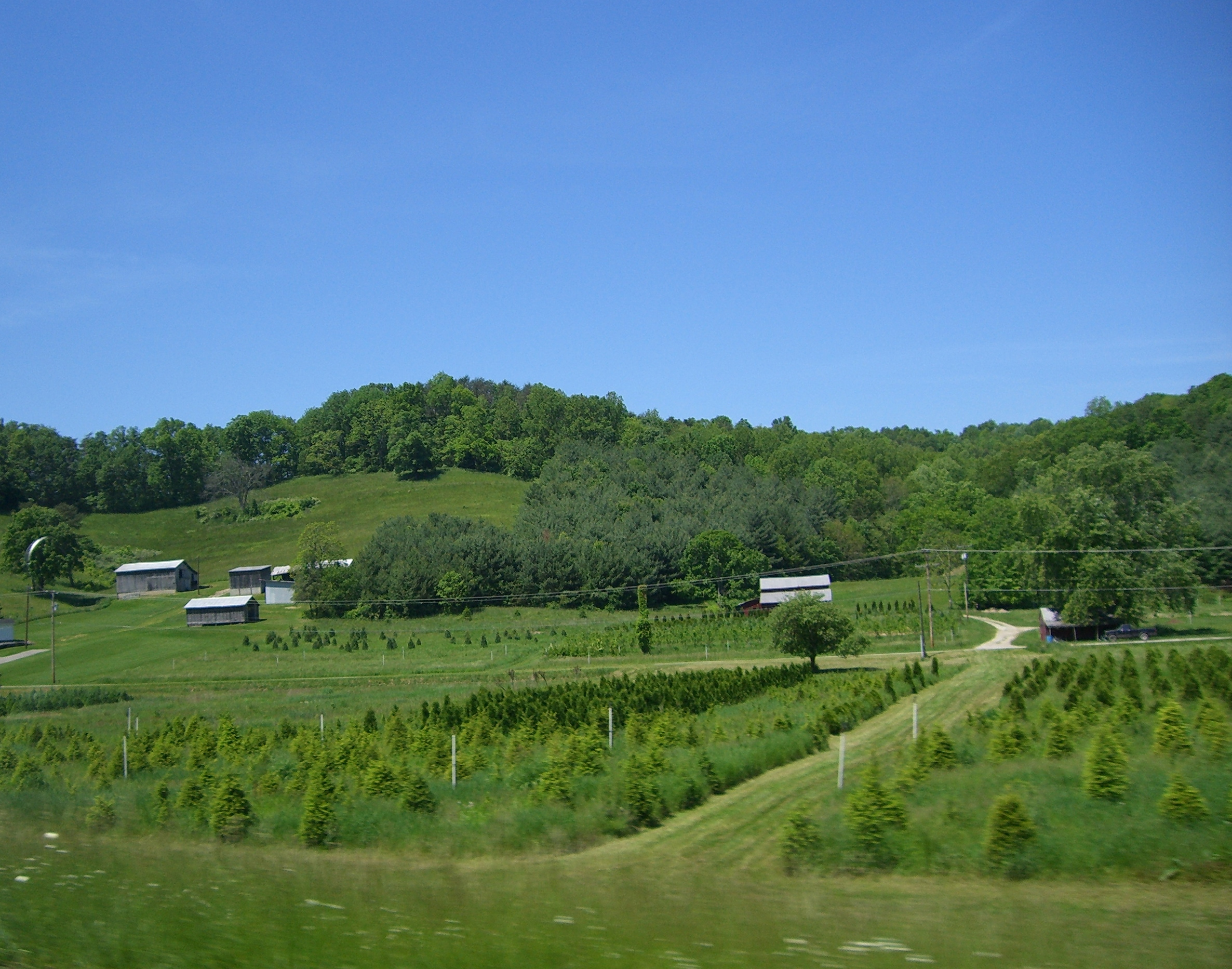
- Farmland in Rush

- Location within the state of Kentucky Rush (the United States)
- Coordinates: 38°17′53″N 82°44′53″W
- Country: United States
- State: Kentucky
- County: Boyd and Carter

Population (2000)
  - Total: 2,755
- Time zone: UTC-5 (Eastern (EST))
  - Summer (DST): UTC-4 (EDT)
- ZIP codes: 41168
- GNIS feature ID: 502475

Rush is an unincorporated community in Boyd and Carter counties in the U.S. state of Kentucky. It is part of the Huntington–Ashland metropolitan area. The reason this community was given the name Rush is obscure. It is located along US 60 and near I-64.

== History ==
The Kentucky General Assembly incorporated Geigerville - an area currently considered part of Rush - as a town on February 3, 1874. It was so named for W. L. Geiger, postmaster at Geigerville. The legislature repealed the town's charter on February 9, 1876. The Rush post office was established on July 25, 1890, with Henry Artist as postmaster.

== Education ==
- Ramey-Estep High School, is located in Boyd County.
- Star Elementary, is located in Carter County and is part of Carter County Public Schools.
- Boyd County Public Schools
