= Nannie Kelly Wright =

American female ironmaster

- Born: Catlettsburg, Kentucky, U.S. September 8, 1856; Nannie Scott Honshell
- Died: December 13, 1946 (aged 90); Ironton, Ohio, U.S.
- Occupation: Businessperson

Nannie Kelly Wright, born Nannie Scott Honshell (September 8, 1856 - December 12, 1946) was the only known American female ironmaster.

== Early life ==
Nannie Scott Honshell was born in Catlettsburg, KY, the daughter of Captain Washington Honshell, a riverman who was one of the founders of Cincinnati's White Collar line. As the daughter of a riverman, she travelled widely throughout her childhood.

== Marriage to Lindsey Kelly ==
On October 8, 1879, Nannie Honshell married State Senator Lindsey Kelly, the son of a pig iron magnate. Lindsey Kelly was the owner/manager of Center Furnace, a charcoal iron furnace in Lawrence County, OH. When he died in 1902 (as did their one child, Lindsey Kelly Jr.), Nannie Kelly became sole proprietress of Center Furnace.

She managed the furnace personally and travelled to Cincinnati weekly to work to sustain the profitability of the furnace. She also inherited from Lindsey Kelly the directorship of the Kelly Nail and Iron Company of Ironton, OH. As the iron ore industry began to decline, the Ohio State Journal noted that Mrs. Kelly "lived in the furnace region, in a primitive house; mined ore and limestone, endured a hard and rugged life, but ever bright, buoyant and full of social engagement with old friends, she lived in the constant hope of retrieving her fortune." Rumor had it at the time that she sometimes worked the furnaces in male clothing, but she always steadfastly denied this. In the end, she was successful at regaining her fortune, and shortly after the turn of the century, she was thought to be the richest woman in the world after Queen Victoria.

== Second marriage and sale of Center Furnace ==
On October 26, 1906, Nannie Kelly married Daniel Gregory Wright, one of the central figures of the Philadelphia financial world at the time, and 21 years her junior. That same year, she sold the Center Furnace to the Superior Portland Cement company, cashing the largest check ($100,000) ever cashed in a local bank at the time. She caused a stir in the business community during these years by supporting President Theodore Roosevelt's anti-trust legislation. In 1919, Nannie Kelly Wright and Daniel Gregory Wright divorced, and in a move that shocked the entire region, Mr. Wright sought alimony from his wife.

== Role in society and impact of stock market crash ==
Nannie Kelly Wright was a pivotal figure in Northern Appalachian society throughout her lifetime. Both of her weddings were lavish affairs far surpassing the most expensive local events of the day. She made 3 world tours and was a frequent party hostess, often giving souvenirs from around the world as party favors. On one trip to London, she was presented before the court of King Edward VII. On one such trip, she became fascinated by English castles and resolved to build one in Ironton. To make room for the castle, she moved her current house across the street in order to clear the block. The castle never materialized, however, and eventually the land was sold and a Catholic High School was built on the plot of land.

Nannie Kelly Wright lost most of her money in the 1929 stock market crash. Although she lived another 17 years, she was able to live comfortably merely by selling pieces of her large jewelry collection every few years.

Nannie Kelly Wright died on December 12, 1946, at the Marting Hotel in Ironton, Ohio.
