= Durbin, Kentucky =

Unincorporated community in Kentucky, United States

- Unincorporated community
- Location within the state of Kentucky Durbin, Kentucky (the United States)
- Coordinates: 38°16′45″N 82°35′54″W
- Country: United States
- State: Kentucky
- County: Boyd
- Elevation: 551 ft (168 m)
- Time zone: UTC-5 (Eastern (EST))
  - Summer (DST): UTC-4 (EDT)
- ZIP code: 41129
- GNIS feature ID: 507893

Durbin, Kentucky is an unincorporated community situated along Kentucky Route 752 and Durbin Creek in southern Boyd County, Kentucky. The post office was established on March 5, 1900, with Robert Struther as postmaster, and was named for Amos Durbin, an early explorer. It is located within the ZIP Code Tabulation Area for zip code 41129, which includes the city of Catlettsburg.
