= Precision Castparts Corp. =

American manufacturing company

Coordinates: 45.4891271°N 122.6728299°W

- Company type: Subsidiary
- Industry: Aerospace and defense
- Founded: April 1, 1953; 73 years ago in Portland, Oregon, U.S.
- Headquarters: Portland, Oregon, U.S.
- Key people: Mark Donegan (Chairman & CEO)
- Products: Investment castings, forged products, fasteners
- Revenue: ▲US$9.6 billion (FY 2014)
- Operating income: ▲US$2.6 billion (FY 2014)
- Net income: ▲US$1.7 billion (FY 2014)
- Total assets: ▲US$18.5 billion (FY 2014)
- Total equity: ▲US$11.4 billion (FY 2014)
- Owner: Berkshire Hathaway (since 2016)
- Number of employees: 30,100 (March 2015)
- Divisions: PCC Airfoils, PCC Structurals, PCC Energy Group, PCC Fasteners, PCC Aerostructures
- Subsidiaries: Wyman-Gordon, Special Metals Corporation, Titanium Metals Corporation, Texas Honing Inc.
- Website: www.precast.com

Precision Castparts Corp. is an American industrial goods and metal fabrication company that manufactures investment castings, forged components, and airfoil castings for use in the aerospace, industrial gas turbine, and defense industries. In 2009, it ranked 362nd on the Fortune 500 list, and 11th in the aerospace and defense industry. In 2015, it ranked 322nd overall and 9th in the aerospace and defense industry. In 2014, it ranked 133rd on the S&P 500 based on market capitalization. In January 2016, the company became a wholly owned subsidiary of Berkshire Hathaway. Before that event, it used to be one of the three Fortune 500 companies headquartered in Oregon.

== History ==
=== 20th century ===
Precision Castparts (PCC) was founded by Joseph Buford Cox on April 1, 1953. Cox was owner of Oregon Saw Chain and in 1949 had started a casting operation to make saw teeth with assistant general manager Ed Cooley also working on the project. In 1953 Cox separated the two companies and PCC was formed, moving into a new larger facility in 1955, and incorporating the following year with Ed Cooley as one of the owners.

=== Early 2000s ===
In 2002, Mark Donegan became President and CEO. SPS Technologies (formerly Standard Pressed Steel) was acquired in 2003. The company received tax breaks from local governments in the Portland metro area in 2006 in exchange for a plant expansion. In 2007, the company purchased Cherry Aerospace to expand their fastener business. After ranking as the 568th largest U.S. company by Fortune in 2007, the company became a Fortune 500 the next year when it ranked 444, and rose to 362 in 2009. It ranked 322 prior to its sale to Berkshire in 2016.

PCC announced the purchase of Carlton Forge Works in October 2009 for $850 million and Primus International Inc. in July 2011 in a $900 million deal. Primus made parts for airplanes, selling their products to both Airbus and Boeing. In May 2012 PCC acquired Centra Industries Inc. a builder of aircraft parts for Boeing, Lockheed Martin, Northrop Grumman, Spirit AeroSystems, Mitsubishi Heavy Industries and Bombardier. They have two plants based in Cambridge, Ontario, Canada. Texas Honing was purchased by PCC in October 2012, followed by the $2.9 billion acquisition of Titanium Metals in November 2012.

In May 2011, toxic chemicals such as nitrogen dioxide and hydrochloric acid were unexpectedly released at the company's titanium plant on Johnson Creek Blvd, Portland, Oregon. Although four people were hospitalized, nobody was permanently injured from the fumes. Firefighters had difficulty shutting down the plant.

The Toxic 100 Air polluters index from the University of Massachusetts listed Precision Castparts as the number one air polluter in the U.S. in the August 2013 edition, although the company called it a flawed study.

=== Berkshire Hathaway era ===
On August 10, 2015, the boards of directors of Berkshire Hathaway Inc. and Precision Castparts Corp. unanimously approved a definitive agreement for Berkshire Hathaway to acquire, for $235 per share in cash, all outstanding PCC shares, for a total sum of $37 billion including assumed debt. The sale was finalized on January 29, 2016, on which date Berkshire Hathaway took ownership of Precision Castparts.

In 2021, Berkshire Hathaway took an almost $11 billion writedown on the investment.

== 2025 SPS Technologies fire ==
In February of 2025, a fire broke out at the Jenkintown SPS Technologies facility that lasted six days.

=== Context ===
SPS Technologies (formerly Standard Pressed Steel) moved its headquarters to Jenkintown, Pennsylvania in 1920. In the months leading up to the fire, the SPS Technologies building did not have a working sprinkler system. The sprinkler system was inoperative due to a water main break. Representatives for SPS claimed that they were in compliance with state and local laws, by establishing cautionary measures such as a firewatch. The facility had been fined in the past for failures to comply with environmental regulations in the 1980s and 2023. The issues found in 2023 were in regards to the storage of chemicals without a permit. The fire marshal of Abington Township confirmed that there was a fire brigade in the building at the time.

=== Incident ===
At approximately 9:30 PM, on Monday February 17th, 2025 reports of fire and explosions were indicated to local authorities by residents. The fire quickly spread throughout the facility, leading to the response of over 50 vehicles, and in excess of 60 fire departments. On Tuesday, the 18th, Ashley McIllvaine, assistant manager of Abington township, acknowledged the facility was still on fire.

As of February 22, 2025 at 3:53 PM local time, the fire was officially declared extinguished. According to final reports on the incident, over one-hundred agencies were involved with fighting the blaze. No employees, citizens, or first responders died during the incident.

=== Impact ===
At least 250 employees have been laid off as of March 15th 2025.

=== Cause ===
As of February 23rd, 2025 the cause of the fire is not known, and investigations are in progress.

== Financials ==
| Year | Revenue | Net Profit |
|---|---|---|
| 2004: | $1,913 | $117 |
| 2005 | $2,919 | ($1.7) |
| 2006 | $3,546 | $350 |
| 2007 | $5,361 | $633 |
| 2008 | $6,852 | $987 |
| 2009 | $6,801 | $1,044 |
| 2010 | $5,486 | $922 |
| 2011 | $6,209 | $1,015 |
| 2012 | $7,202 | $1,226 |
| 2013 | $8,361 | $1,430 |
| 2014 | $9,616 | $1,784 |

^{*In millions of US dollars.}

Listed on the New York Stock Exchange as PCP, the company was part of the S&P 400. In 2007, Precision was moved to the S&P 500 stock index. As seen in the table above, PCP's revenue increased by 52 percent in 2007, to $5.4 billion from $3.5 billion in 2006. Total debt increased by 29 percent, from $677 million in 2006 to $873 million in 2007. The increases in revenue and debt were due in part to a pair of acquisitions in February 2007: GSC Foundries, Inc. (GSC), formerly a competitor to PCP in producing aluminum and steel structural investment castings, and Cherry Aerospace LLC (Cherry), a manufacturer of aerospace blind rivets and blind bolts.

== Products ==
The company manufactures a variety of parts for the aerospace industry including many jet engine components. PCC also makes medical prostheses and parts for other industrial applications such as in the oil industry, in the gas industry, and for use in power generating turbines for producing electricity. They are considered a leader in the manufacturing of both jet engine airfoils and gas turbines used for generating electricity. The company generates $1.5 million in revenue for each Boeing 787 Dreamliner built. Other products made from the various metals are fasteners, products for the paper industry, parts used in the defense industry, and parts for the automotive industry. PCC's main markets are the United States, Europe, and Asia.

== See also ==
- List of companies based in Oregon
