= Winslow, Kentucky =

Unincorporated community in Kentucky, United States

Winslow
- Unincorporated community
- Location within the state of Kentucky Winslow (the United States)
- Coordinates: 38°27′13″N 82°40′55″W
- Country: United States
- State: Kentucky
- County: Boyd
- Elevation: 607 ft (185 m)
- Time zone: UTC-5 (Eastern (EST))
  - Summer (DST): UTC-4 (EST)
- GNIS feature ID: 506954

Winslow is an unincorporated community and former coal town on KY 1134 in Boyd County, Kentucky, United States. Its post office is closed.
