= Garner, Boyd County, Kentucky =

Unincorporated community in Kentucky, United States

Garner, Kentucky
- Unincorporated community
- Location within Kentucky
- Coordinates: 38°17′41″N 82°44′09″W
- Country: United States
- State: Kentucky
- County: Boyd
- Elevation: 640 ft (200 m)
- Time zone: UTC-5 (Eastern (EST))
  - Summer (DST): UTC-4 (EDT)
- Area code: 606
- GNIS feature ID: 508069

Garner is an unincorporated community in Boyd County, Kentucky, United States. Garner is located on Pigeon Roost Creek at the junction of Kentucky Route 854 and Kentucky Route 1945, 10.6 miles (17.1 km) southwest of Catlettsburg.
