= Durbin =

Durbin may refer to:

== People ==
- Durbin (surname), people with the surname

First name

- Durbin Feeling (1946-2020), American Cherokee linguist
- Durbin Feltman (born 1997), American baseball player
- Durbin Ward (1819–1886), American lawyer, politician, newspaper publisher, and Civil War soldier

== Places ==
United States

- Durbin, Indiana, unincorporated community
- Durbin, Kentucky, an unincorporated community
- Durbin, North Dakota, an unincorporated community
- Durbin, Ohio, an unincorporated community
- Durbin, West Virginia, a town

== Mathematics / Statistics ==
- Durbin test, a nonparametric test for balanced incomplete designs
- Durbin–Watson statistic, a test statistic
- Durbin–Wu–Hausman test, a statistical hypothesis test in econometrics

== Other ==
- Durbin amendment, a provision of United States federal law that limits fees charged to retailers for debit card processing
- Durbin and Greenbrier Valley Railroad, an American heritage and freight railroad in Virginia and West Virginia
- Durbin Hotel, a historic hotel building located in Rushville, Indiana
- Durbins, a listed building in Guildford, Surrey, once owned by artist Roger Fry

== See also ==
- Durban, a city in South Africa
