= Rockdale, Kentucky =

Unincorporated community in Kentucky, United States

Rockdale
- Unincorporated community
- Location within the state of Kentucky Rockdale (the United States)
- Coordinates: 38°25′8″N 82°41′53″W
- Country: United States
- State: Kentucky
- County: Boyd
- Elevation: 656 ft (200 m)

Population (2000)
  - Total: 288,649
- Time zone: UTC-5 (Eastern (EST))
  - Summer (DST): UTC-4 (EDT)
- GNIS feature ID: 502159

Rockdale is an unincorporated community in Boyd County, Kentucky, United States, located south of Ashland. It is located on Midland Trail (original U.S. Route 60) at its intersection of Kentucky Route 538 and corridor into the city of Ashland. It was mostly a rural area until the 1970s, when a large subdivision began development, with several hundred tract houses.

Rockdale is a part of the Huntington-Ashland Metropolitan Statistical Area (MSA). As of the 2010 census, the MSA had a population of 287,702. New definitions from February 28, 2013, placed the population at 363,000.

== Education ==
Boyd County Public Schools
