= Incoloy =

Superalloy brand produced by the Special Metals Corporation

Incoloy refers to a range of superalloys now produced by the Special Metals Corporation (SMC) group of companies and created with a trademark by the Inco company in 1952. Originally Inco protected these alloys by patent. In 2000, the SMC published a 61-page document entitled "High-Performance Alloys for Resistance to Aqueous Corrosion" highlighting Incoloy, as well as Monel and Inconel products, and their use in fluid environments such as sulfuric acid, hydrochloric acid, hydrofluoric acid, phosphoric acid, nitric acid, other acids as well as freshwater environments.

Incoloy products are mostly chromium-based and mostly nickel-based, and designed for corrosion resistance as well as strength at high temperatures.

Incoloy alloys belong to the category of super austenitic stainless steels. One advantage is that Incoloy alloys do not have to be heat treated after welding to restore the corrosion resistance.

== Types ==
There are different alloys to resist particular chemical attacks or under specific circumstances: for example, the DS Incoloy is to be used in heat-treating furnaces with reactive atmospheres and many heat cycles.

Incoloy 020 "exhibits excellent corrosion resistance in chemical environments that contain sulfuric acid, chlorides, phosphoric acid and nitric acid."

Incoloy 028 "is resistant to both acids and salts. The copper content makes it resistant to sulfuric acid."

Incoloy 330 "exhibits good strength at high temperatures and good resistance to oxidation and reduction environments."

Incoloy 800 "is capable of remaining stable and maintaining its austenitic structure even after long time exposures to high temperatures".

Incoloy 803 is designed for sulfur-rich environments.

Incoloy 825 is approved for use in heat exchanger tubes by ASTM B163, and approved for pressure vessel operating temperatures up to 525°C or up to 538°C. It "offers exceptional resistance to corrosion by sulfuric acid and phosphoric acid".

Incoloy 908 "has high tensile strength, fatigue crack growth resistance, good weldability, metallurgical stability and ductility, high fracture and impact toughness, [and] low coefficient of thermal expansion... [Its] resistance to oxygen embrittlement... allows hot fabrication without cracking."

Incoloy 907 "has high strength and low thermal expansion coefficient at temperatures up to 800°F."

Incoloy 945X is designed for chlorine-rich environments. Molybdenum adds crevice corrosion and pitting resistance to Incoloy 945.

Incoloy MA956 is made by a mechanical alloying rather than a bulk-melting process; it was studied for space reactor components in the JIMO project. It is difficult to weld and needs to be heated to 200C for forming processes. A special friction welding process has been developed for it.

== Compositions (percentages) ==
Alloy name	Fe	Cr	Al	Ti	C	Y_{2}O_{3}	Cu	Mn	Co	Ni	P	Si	S	Mo	Nb
020	35	19-21	0	0	0	0	3-4	<2	0	32-38	0	<1	0	2-3	0
028	29-40.4	26-28	0	0	0	0	?	<2.5	0	30-34	0	0	0	3-4	0
803	29.435-42.64	25-29	0	0	0	0	0	<1.5	0	32-37	0	<1	0	0	0
945	balance	19.5-23	0.01-0.7	0.5-2.5	0.005-0.04	0	1.5-3	1	0	45-55	0.03	0.5	0.03	3-4	2.5-4.5
945X	balance	19.5-23	0.01-0.7	0.5-2.5	0.005-0.04	0	1.5-3	1	0	45-55	0.03	0.5	0.03	3-4	2.5-4.5
330	Fe 43	17-20	0	0	0	0	0	<2	0	34-37	0	*	0	0	0
825	Fe >22, ~33	19.5-23.5	<0.2	0.6-1.2	<0.05	0	1.5-3.0	<1.0	0	38-46	0	<0.5	<0.03	2.5-3.5	0
907	Fe 42	0	0.03	1.5	0	0	0	0	13	38	0	0.15	0	0	4.7
908	35.588 - 44.6	3.75 - 4.5	0.75 - 1.25	1.2 - 1.8	<0.03	0	<0.5	<1	<0.5	47 - 51	<0.015	<0.5	<0.005	0	2.7-3.3
800	Fe >39.5	19-23	0	0	0	0	0	<1.5%	0	30-35	0	0	0	0	0
020	Fe (~40%)	20	n/p	n/p	<0.07	n/p	3.5	<2.0	n/p	35	<0.045	<1.0	<0.035	2.5	about 1
DS	Fe (~40%)	18	n/p	0.2	0.1	nil	0.5	0.8-1.5	18 (Co+Ni 38)	18 (Co+Ni 38)	n/p	2.3	0.03		
MA956	Fe (~75%)	20	4.75	0.4	<0.1	0.5	<0.15	<0.3	<0.3	<0.5	<0.02	n/p	n/p		

== See also ==
- Inconel
- Monel
- Hastelloy
