= Summit, Kentucky =

Unincorporated community in Kentucky, United States

Summit
- Unincorporated community
- Location within the state of Kentucky Summit (the United States)
- Coordinates: 38°26′23″N 82°42′15″W
- Country: United States
- State: Kentucky
- County: Boyd

Population (2000)
  - Total: unknown
- Time zone: UTC-5 (Eastern (EST))
  - Summer (DST): UTC-4 (EDT)

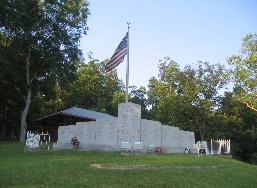
The Boyd County War Memorial in Summit's Armco Park

Summit is an unincorporated community in Boyd County, Kentucky, United States on US 60 just west of Ashland. Summit serves as a suburb to the city of Ashland and shares the city's ZIP code. Summit is sometimes spelled with two "T's" at the end, although the most common spelling contains only one "T" but either variation is accepted as correct.

Summit is a part of the Huntington-Ashland, WV-KY-OH, Metropolitan Statistical Area (MSA). As of the 2000 census, the MSA had a population of 288,649. The Summit name was first applied to a 19th-century railroad passenger and freight station located at the site. Summit was selected as descriptive of the location's unique topographical features including a flat terrain on a higher elevation than other parts of the surrounding area. Unusual for the region, this terrain was created by the ancient Teay's River and the associated Glacial Lake Tight. The Lexington, Elizabethtown, and Big Sandy Railroad opened a station here in the late 19th century after the railroad was constructed through Summit. It served the residents of what was then a sparsely populated farming community until the station was closed due to its close proximity to Ashland made it no longer necessary. Now a populated suburban area, Summit's development was slow until the Federal Correctional Institution was located at the heart of Summit on Kentucky Route 716. This and the upgrading of U.S. Route 60, made transportation easier for residents to commute to and from Ashland.

== Government and infrastructure ==
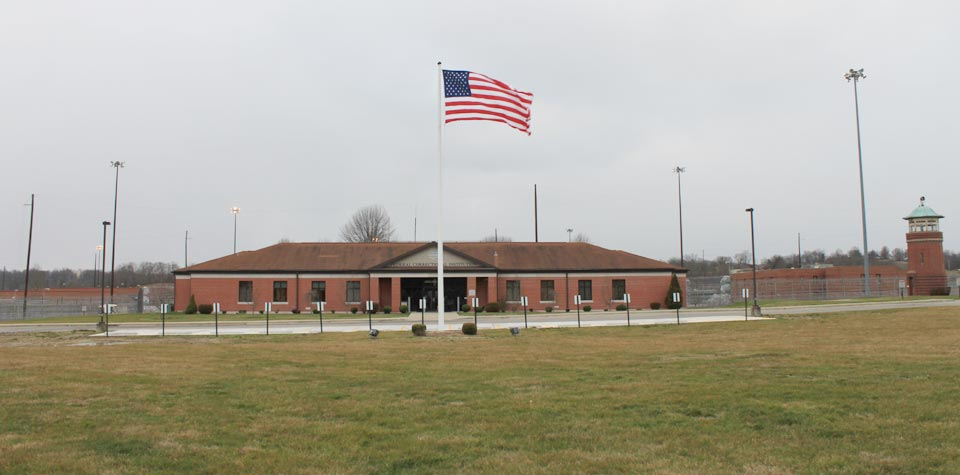
Federal Correctional Institution, Ashland

The Federal Bureau of Prisons operates the Federal Correctional Institution, Ashland in Summit, 5 miles (8.0 km) southwest of Ashland. There is also an adjacent federal prison camp, which in 2006 was listed as one of the best places to go to prison by Forbes magazine.

Kentucky State Police Post 14 is located on U.S. 60 in Summit, next to Armco Park. In addition to Boyd County, troopers from Post 14 serve Carter, Greenup and Lawrence Counties.

The United States Postal Service operates the Summitt Post Office.

== Education ==
Two Boyd County public schools, Summit Elementary and Boyd County Middle School are located in Summit. Both are a part of the Boyd County Public School District.

== Points of interest ==
- Armco Park - A community recreational park. The Boyd County War Memorial and John CC Mayo Amphitheatre are located within the park.
- Ashland Boyd County Dog Park. Established in 2003, it is designed to create a safe, attractive area where dogs can run and play off-leash under the supervision of their owners.
