= Burnaugh, Kentucky =

Unincorporated community in Kentucky, United States

- Unincorporated community
- Nickname: Big Town of Burnaugh
- Location within the state of Kentucky Burnaugh, Kentucky (the United States)
- Coordinates: 38°15′37″N 82°34′54″W
- Country: United States
- State: Kentucky
- County: Boyd
- Elevation: 587 ft (179 m)
- Time zone: UTC-5 (Eastern (EST))
  - Summer (DST): UTC-4 (EDT)
- ZIP code: 41129
- GNIS feature ID: 488442

Burnaugh, Kentucky is an unincorporated community located in Boyd County, Kentucky along U.S. Route 23. Being located between the Burgess Station, a former C&O Freight and passenger terminal and Kavanaugh, it takes its name from the combination of the two communities. It is located on both the former Mayo Trail (Ky. Rt. 3 prior to 1964) and present-day U.S. Route 23. Burnaugh is located within the ZIP Code Tabulation Area for zip code 41129, which includes the nearby city of Catlettsburg.

Special Metals Corporation has operated a facility at Burnaugh since 1967.
