= Turban lily =

Turban lily is a common name for several plant species and may refer to:

- Lilium martagon, native to Europe and Asia
- Lilium pomponium, native to France, Spain, and Italy
