= Catlett House (Catlettsburg, Kentucky) =

- U.S. National Register of Historic Places
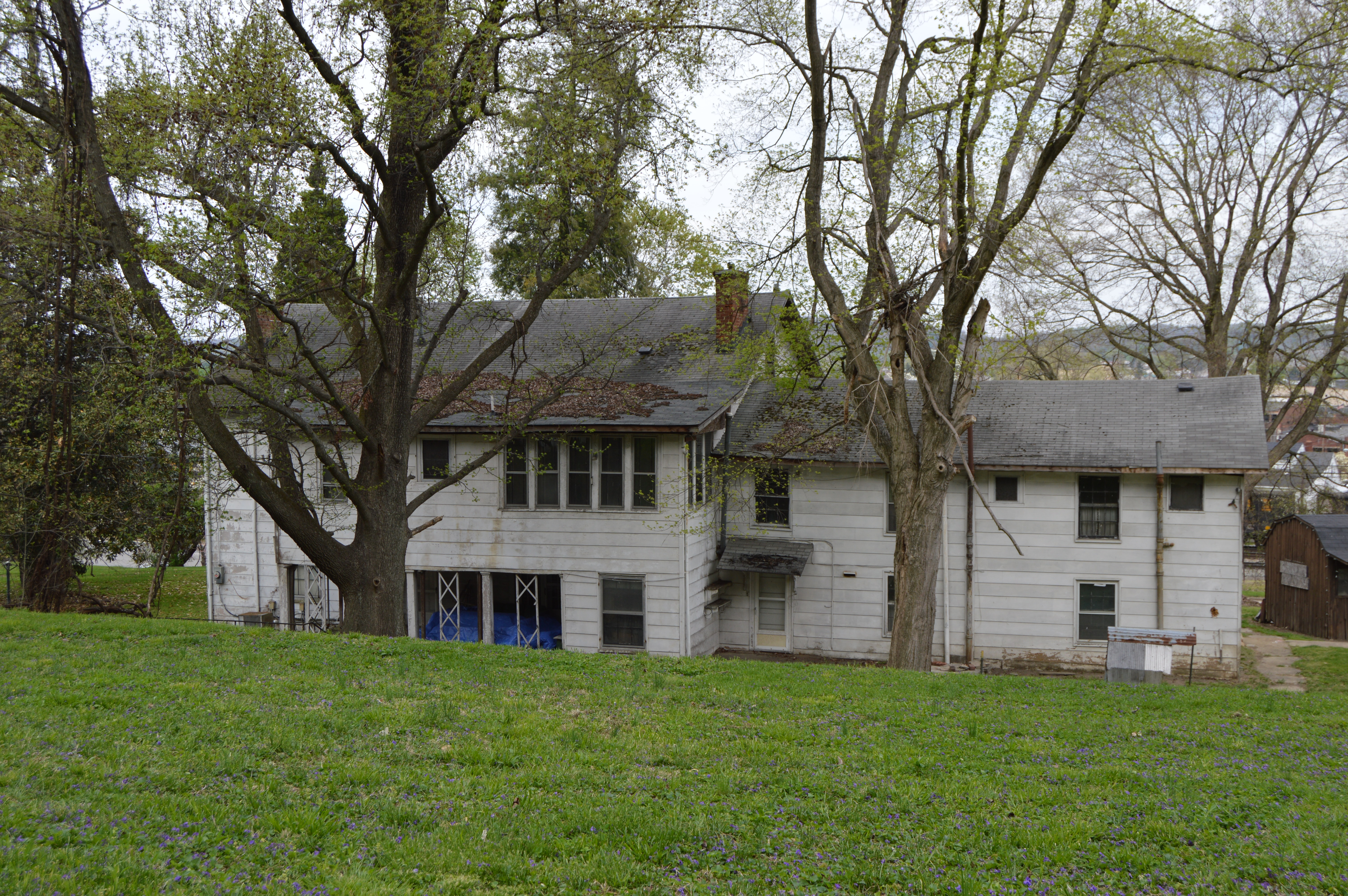

- Location within Kentucky Location within the United States
- Location: 1600 Walnut Street, Catlettsburg, Kentucky
- Coordinates: 38°28′1″N 82°36′0″W
- Built: circa 1812
- NRHP reference No.: 73000788
- Added to NRHP: May 25, 1973

The Catlett House, also known as Beechmoor Place, is a historic house located in Catlettsburg, Kentucky. It has been listed on the National Register of Historic Places since May 25, 1973. Approximately one-half of this building was built circa 1812 by two brothers, Horatio and Alexander Catlett Jr. The Catlett brothers and their parents, Alexander Catlett (1748–1823) and Susanna Beall, were early settlers to the area and operated a trading post, inn, tavern, and U.S. Post Office from this location for many years. Natives of Virginia, the Catletts settled at Mouth of Sandy around the turn of the 19th century. They capitalized on the growing river trade and prospered at this location. The town was laid out in 1849 by civil engineer James Fry and named Catlett's Burgh in honor of the two brothers, who were the first European settlers of present-day Catlettsburg.

In the early 1860s, many years after the Catletts ceased to do business in Catlettsburg, a larger addition was built on to the Catlett House by then owner C.W. Culver. The original Catlett House became the south wing of the new dwelling. It was covered in white clapboard siding and used as a living quarters for the servants of the larger home. In 1868 the wife of Colonel Laban T. Moore purchased the three-acre property with home from Mr. Culver for $10,000. Colonel Moore, an attorney, had served one term in the United States House of Representatives in Washington, D.C., and was a member of the 14th Regiment Kentucky Volunteer Infantry. Once under his ownership, he named the house Beechmoor for the large beech tree that stood on the property and for his surname of Moore.

Beechmoor has remained under the ownership of Colonel Laban T. Moore's descendants since 1868. It is still a grand residence, with a library featuring over 2,000 works of literature, a music parlor, a formal sitting parlor, a formal dining room, and four bedrooms upstairs in the main house. Several 64-inch-diameter (1,600 mm) wood logs of virgin timber hold the 42-foot-wide (13 m) house up from its natural stone cellar. The Catlett House portion is not recognizable as a log cabin, the logs have been covered over with wood siding. The last full-time resident of the Catlett House/Beechmoor home was Rebecca Patton, Colonel Laban T. Moore's granddaughter. She died in 1986, well over 90 years of age. Before her death, she dedicated herself to the preservation of her beloved lifelong home. Since her 1986 death the home has been maintained with proceeds from a trust fund she created before her death and the rental income from seven houses on the estate. The first portico was replaced with a second larger portico. It has since been removed, and the original green wood swinging shutters have also been removed. An effort to restore the estate has been underway by Col. Moore's present-day descendants recently, with exterior painting completed in June 2014.

== See also ==
- National Register of Historic Places listings in Boyd County, Kentucky
