= Fairview Independent Schools (Kentucky) =

School district based in Boyd County, Kentucky

Fairview Independent Schools is a public school district based in Boyd County, Kentucky, United States. The district serves the area within the census-designated place of Westwood. The district consists of two schools: Fairview High School and Fairview Elementary School. The elementary school serves students from Pre-K to fifth grade and the high school serves students from sixth grade to twelfth grade. The school colors are black, white, and red.

== Personnel ==
The current principal of Fairview High School is Charles Clark. Whitney Ward and Mo Mullins are assistant principals of the high/middle school. Leslie Workman is Fairview Elementary School's principal.

The Fairview school district superintendent is Jackie Risden-Smith. Jackie Risden-Smith is also the Communications/Public Information Officer. Tonia Lucas is the school counselor, course code contact career & technical education, and dual credit contact.

The primary points of contact are Benjamin Coleman, Crystal Claar, Jason Morrison, Leigh Ann Jobe, Bryan Adkins, and Kristen Sorrel.

== District ==
In the Fairview Independent school district, the total population is approximately 3,820 people. There are a total of 1,503 households in the district. 35.4% of structures were built before 1970, 44.3% were built between 1970 and 1999, and 10.3% were built in 2000 and after. 88.2% of residents have broadband internet. 62.3% of housing units are houses and 36.7% are apartments.

== Ranking and stats ==
The current rankings of Fairview Middle School is made in comparison to other Kentucky middle schools. It is currently ranked 297th in Kentucky. 72% of students are economically disadvantaged. The teacher to student ratio is 1:14. 17% of students meet Kentucky math proficiency standards and 37% of students meet Kentucky reading proficiency standards.

The current rankings of Fairview Elementary School is made in comparison to other Kentucky elementary schools. It is currently ranked 343rd in Kentucky. 77% of the school is considered economically disadvantaged. The teacher to student ratio is 1:13. The minority percentage is 8%. 32% of students meet Kentucky math proficiency standards and 32% of students meet Kentucky reading proficiency standards.

The current rankings of Fairview High School is made in comparison to other Kentucky high schools. It is currently ranked 147th in the state. 8% of the students are minorities. 72% of students are economically disadvantaged. Nationally, it is ranked 10,603rd. The graduation rate is 91%. 40% of students meet Kentucky reading proficiency. 55% of students qualify for the free lunch program while another 17% qualify for discounted lunches.

Fairview High School college readiness is in the 27th percentile. 48% of graduates pursue an in-state college or vocational school. 84% of those students return for a second year. 91% of students graduate. About 56% of students are male and 44% are female.

== Population and opportunities ==
There are about 257 students in Fairview Elementary School and about 325 students in the high school. There are currently 582 students in the schools. There are currently about 47 teachers employed. The total staff count is 105 people. There are currently about 23 elementary teachers and 19 high school teachers. 7.5% of teachers are in their first or second year.

Fairview High school offers advanced and college courses. The average ACT score is 22. The school also offers various sports and academic programs/clubs including, but not limited to: golf, baseball, basketball, softball, football, bowling, Odyssey of the Mind, Key club, Beta club, National Honors Society, Spanish Honor Society, and archery.
