= Ashland Independent School District =

School district in Kentucky, United States

School district Logo

The Ashland Independent School District is a school district based in Boyd County, Kentucky. The district serves the area within the city limits of Ashland, Kentucky.

== Administration ==
=== Board of education ===
Regular meetings of the board are held on the fourth Monday of each month.

Members

- Chris Clark, chairperson
- David Latherow, vice-chairperson
- Carol Jackson, member
- Mark McCarty, member
- Bruce Morrison, member

Ex officio members without vote

- Sean Howard, secretary (superintendent)
- Kristen Martin, treasurer (finance officer)

=== Superintendent ===
The current superintendent of the Ashland Independent School District is D. Sean Howard, who replaced Stephen E. Gilmore on July 1, 2016. Howard most recently served as superintendent of the Glasgow Independent School District in western Kentucky and was a former assistant superintendent and principal in the neighboring Russell Independent School District.

From 1968 to 1970, James B. Graham served as superintendent. He left to become superintendent of the Bowling Green Independent School District. He went on to serve as state superintendent for public instruction from 1976 to 1980 and as the state Auditor for Public Accounts from 1980 to 1984.

== Schools ==
=== Primary schools (Grades K to 5) ===
==== Crabbe Elementary ====
John Grant Crabbe was born in Mt. Sterling, Ohio, on Nov. 29, 1865. He earned A.B. and A.M. degrees from Ohio Wesleyan University. He received honorary degrees from: Ohio University, Berea College, Miami University and the University of Kentucky.

Dr. Crabbe came to Kentucky as superintendent of the schools in Ashland. His leadership in an early construction program led to the 1895 naming of John Grant Crabbe School located on school property in Ashland's Central Park.

He was elected state superintendent of Kentucky public instruction in 1907. As state superintendent, he served on the board of regents at Eastern Kentucky State Normal School No. 1 in Richmond KY. He became Eastern's president in 1910.

Dr. Crabbe was named a member of the National Council of Education, and in 1911, became president of the Department of Normal Schools of the Southern Education Association. The next year (1912) he became president of the National Education Association. In 1916, he was state director of the N.E.A.

Dr. Crabbe resigned from Eastern on Sept. 1, 1916, to become president of Colorado State Teachers College.

In 1958, the Ashland Board of Education announced the 1895 building would be razed, the planned construction of a new elementary school in the same location, and “to continue to honor Dr. Crabbe’s achievements by keeping the name of the structure it will be replacing”.

John Grant Crabbe is the name of the Eastern Kentucky University Library in Richmond and of the Crabbe Elementary School in Ashland which stand as tributes to this innovator and leader in Kentucky public education.

==== Hager Elementary ====
John Franklin Hager was born in Floyd County, Kentucky in 1853. Left an orphan at an early age, Hager was preeminently a self-educated man. At the age of nine he ran away from the foster home in Floyd County and worked the “push boats” on the Big Sandy River. He was an accomplished banjo player and was a collector of river songs, which often referenced the Pike to Catlettsburg route.

With no formal education, he later became a legal apprentice in Catlettsburg, KY. He was admitted to the Kentucky Bar Association in 1873. Shortly after admission to the Bar Association, he began his law practice in Ashland, KY. He served as president of the Boyd County Bar Association and the Kentucky Bar Association. He was an advocate for civic betterment and activities for the improvement of human conditions, regardless of race or creed.

Jean Bell Thomas, nicknamed the "Traipsin' Woman", served has Judge Hager's clerk. She often traveled to courts in the mountains of eastern Kentucky by jolt-wagon and shared many of Judge Hager's collected river songs.

Prior to President Harding's August 1923 death, Judge Hager was being considered for the U.S. Supreme Court vacancy. (Evening newspaper December 21, 1933)

==== Poage Elementary ====
Named for the Poage family, who established the settlement Poage's Landing, which became the City of Ashland.

=== Secondary schools ===
==== Ashland Middle School ====
Ashland Middle School serves grades 6 to 8.

==== Paul G. Blazer High School ====
Blazer High serves grades 9 to 12.

Paul Garrett Blazer was born in New Boston, Illinois in 1890. He earned an A.A. degree in philosophy from the University of Chicago in 1915.

Blazer came to Ashland in 1924 as general manager of the nearby Leach refinery, which had been purchased by Swiss Oil of Lexington, KY. In 1936, the Ashland refinery management group formed the Ashland Oil & Refining Company to run the former Swiss Oil operations. Blazer was named president of the new company.

Blazer would become a senior advisor on petroleum matters in US Department of Interior from 1933 to 1957, a leader in the development of the modernization of the Ohio River transportation network, and a recognized statewide supporter of education. He was instrumental in the opening of the Ashland Junior College and its later affiliation with the University of Kentucky, a visible supporter for ending racial segregation in Kentucky education, and a facilitator of the expansion of Kentucky Educational Television beyond Jefferson County (Louisville). The Kentucky Press Association named Blazer the Kentuckian of the Year for 1954.

In 1958, the Ashland Board of Education announced the naming of Paul G. Blazer High School.
