= Boyd County High School =

Location
- 14375 Lions Lane; Ashland, Kentucky 41102; United States; 38.379°N 82.703°W

Information
- Other name: BCHS
- Type: Public high school
- School district: Boyd County Public Schools
- Superintendent: William Boblett
- NCES School ID: 210062000108
- Principal: Kelly Fox
- Teaching staff: 59.08 (on an FTE basis)
- Grades: 9–12
- Enrollment: 928 (2023-2024)
- Student to teacher ratio: 15.71
- Colors: Red and White
- Athletics conference: Kentucky High School Athletic Association
- Mascot: Lion (sometimes “Leo the Lion”)
- Nickname: Lions/Lady Lions
- Website: bchs.boyd.kyschools.us

Boyd County High School (BCHS) is a public high school in Cannonsburg, Kentucky, United States. It is part of the Boyd County Public Schools district.

It is an affiliate school of the Gilder Lehrman Institute of American History and home to one of only two Rho Kappa National Social Studies Honor Society chapters in Eastern Kentucky. That chapter's online Digital Humanities Center is currently developing the Kentucky Humanities & Social Sciences Degree Index.

October 22, 2010, ground was broken for this high school. The building was dedicated December 13, 2012 and students arrived in January 2013.

The former high school is now used for other activities, and is at 12307 Midland Trail Rd, Ashland KY 41102. It is called Boyd County Public Schools Heritage Building.

== Sports ==
The Tri-State Tomahawks, a former professional independent league baseball team, played their home games at the Boyd County High School baseball field. The played in the Frontier League in 1993 and disbanded during the 1993 season. The name Tri-State Tomahawks is derived from the geographical location of the Huntington–Ashland metropolitan area near the convergence of Ohio, Kentucky and West Virginia where the team was based.
