= Titanium Metals Corporation =

American manufacturer

- Company type: Subsidiary
- Traded as: NYSE: TIE
- Industry: Titanium alloy production
- Founded: 1950; 76 years ago
- Headquarters: Warrensville Heights, Ohio, United States
- Key people: Steve Wright (President); Stephen P. Fox (Vice President Quality & Technology)
- Products: Titanium sponge; titanium alloy ingot, sheet, strip, billet, plate, tube
- Revenue: ▲US$1.26 billion (2007)
- Owner: Berkshire Hathaway (since 2016)
- Number of employees: 2,530 (2007)
- Parent: Precision Castparts Corp. (since 2012)
- Website: www.timet.com

Titanium Metals Corporation, or most commonly referred to as TIMET, a shortened version of "TItanium METals" that is a registered company trademark. TIMET, founded in 1950, is an American manufacturer of titanium-based metals products, focusing primarily on the aerospace industry headquartered in Warrensville Heights, Ohio. Its major U.S. operations are based in Morgantown, Pennsylvania; Henderson, Nevada; Vallejo, California; and Toronto, Ohio. Its overseas operations are primarily based in the United Kingdom (in Waunarlwydd and Witton) and in France (in the village of Ugine).

In September, 2007, TIMET entered into a ten-year supply agreement with United Technologies Corporation (UTC). Under the agreement, TIMET would supply titanium to UTC for commercial and military aircraft and aircraft engines.

In November 2012, the company was purchased for $2.9 billion by Precision Castparts Corp.(PCC) and now operates under the PCC Metals Group Division.

In March 2014, TIMET began operation of a Groundwater Extraction and Treatment System (GWETS) to capture and treat contaminated groundwater under the Henderson NV site.

In January 2016, Precision Castparts Corp. became a wholly owned subsidiary of Berkshire Hathaway.
