= Boyd County Public Schools (Kentucky) =

School district in Kentucky, United States

Boyd County Public Schools is a school district based in Boyd County, Kentucky. The district serves the area within Catlettsburg and the rest of Boyd County, excluding the city of Ashland and the census-designated place of Westwood, each of which has its own school district. As of 2025, the district hosts 2701 students and 232 teachers across 9 schools.

== Schools ==
- Boyd County High School - Grades 9 to 12
- Ramey-Estep High School - Grades 6 to 12
- Boyd County Central - Alternative School Grades 6 to 12
- Boyd County Career and Technical Education Center
- Boyd County Middle School - Grades 6 to 8

=== Primary schools (Grades K to 5) ===
- Cannonsburg Elementary
- Catlettsburg Elementary
- Ponderosa Elementary
- Summit Elementary

=== Early Childhood Learning Centers (Head Start/Preschool) ===
- Early Childhood Learning Center - North
- Early Childhood Learning Center - South
- Catlettsburg Preschool
