= Westwood, Boyd County, Kentucky =

Census-designated place in Kentucky, United States

Westwood, Kentucky
- Census-designated place
- Location within the state of Kentucky
- Coordinates: 38°28′57″N 82°40′41″W
- Country: United States
- State: Kentucky
- County: Boyd

Area
  - Total: 3.83 sq mi (9.92 km^{2})
  - Land: 3.74 sq mi (9.68 km^{2})
  - Water: 0.097 sq mi (0.25 km^{2})
- Elevation: 682 ft (208 m)

Population (2020)
  - Total: 4,387
  - Density: 1,174.1/sq mi (453.33/km^{2})
- Time zone: UTC-5 (Eastern (EST))
  - Summer (DST): UTC-4 (EDT)
- ZIP code: 41101 & 41102
- Area code: 606
- FIPS code: 21-82146
- GNIS feature ID: 0506507

Westwood is a census-designated place in Boyd County, Kentucky, United States. The population was 4,387 at the 2020 census. A suburb of Ashland, the two areas are closely affiliated, sharing a ZIP code and bus system. Westwood is located on a flat to hilly elevation just west of the Ohio River. The flat hilltop is unusual to eastern Kentucky and was created by the preglacial Teays River which existed in ancient times and flowed in the opposite direction of the Ohio River. Westwood is part of the Huntington–Ashland metropolitan area.

== History ==
Westwood was developed after 1920 as a planned residential addition to the city of Ashland, but due to its residents' independence, annexation into the city of Ashland has never occurred. Employees of nearby Armco Steel American Rolling Mill Company, now AK Steel employed the majority of homeowners in Westwood. Development took place from 1920 to 1950, although some additions have been made after that period. As the population of Westwood grew, the community was never incorporated as a city. According to U.S. Census Data, it is one of the largest unincorporated communities in the state of Kentucky.

== Geography ==
Westwood is located at 38°28′57″N 82°40′41″W (38.482422, -82.678028).

According to the United States Census Bureau, the CDP has a total area of 3.8 square miles (9.9 km^{2}), of which 3.7 square miles (9.7 km^{2}) is land and 0.077 square miles (0.2 km^{2}), or 2.48%, is water.

Westwood is located mostly on a flat ridge west of the Ohio River. The southern boundary is the Ashland city limits, and the northern boundary is Hood's Creek. The flat elevation in which Westwood is located was created by the ancient Teays River. The course of the river was altered due to glacial formations around two million years ago. It resulted in many flat hill tops that are commonly found in Boyd and Greenup counties which are evident on aerial satellite imagery. Outside of this ancient river bed, the terrain is "ridge and valley" as is typical in most of Eastern Kentucky.

== Demographics ==
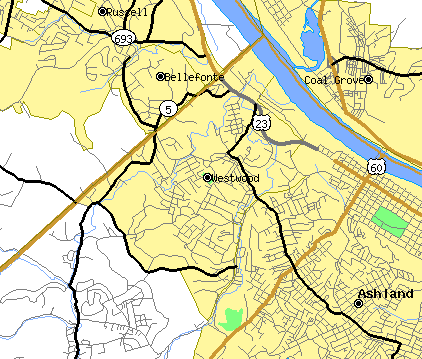
Map of Westwood and surrounding communities

Historical population
Census	Pop.	Note	%±
2000	4,888		—
2010	4,746		−2.9%
2020	4,387		−7.6%
U.S. Decennial Census

As of the census of 2000, there were 4,888 people, 2,004 households, and 1,468 families residing in the CDP. The population density was 1,253.1 inhabitants per square mile (483.8/km^{2}). There were 2,191 housing units at an average density of 561.7 per square mile (216.9/km^{2}). The racial makeup of the CDP was 98.20% White, 0.47% African American, 0.08% Native American, 0.37% Asian, 0.04% from other races, and 0.84% from two or more races. Hispanic or Latino of any race were 0.49% of the population.

There were 2,004 households, out of which 26.6% had children under the age of 18 living with them, 58.0% were married couples living together, 11.3% had a female householder with no husband present, and 26.7% were non-families. 23.9% of all households were made up of individuals, and 10.5% had someone living alone who was 65 years of age or older. The average household size was 2.43 and the average family size was 2.84.

In the CDP the population was spread out, with 20.9% under the age of 18, 9.0% from 18 to 24, 26.1% from 25 to 44, 27.0% from 45 to 64, and 16.9% who were 65 years of age or older. The median age was 41 years. For every 100 females, there were 95.1 males. For every 100 females age 18 and over, there were 90.8 males.

The median income for a household in the CDP was $29,394, and the median income for a family was $36,094. Males had a median income of $30,196 versus $19,938 for females. The per capita income for the CDP was $18,455. About 9.1% of families and 14.2% of the population were below the poverty line, including 20.0% of those under age 18 and 7.6% of those age 65 or over.

== Education ==
Westwood has its own school district, the Fairview Independent School District.
