= Boyd County, Kentucky =

County in Kentucky, United States

- County
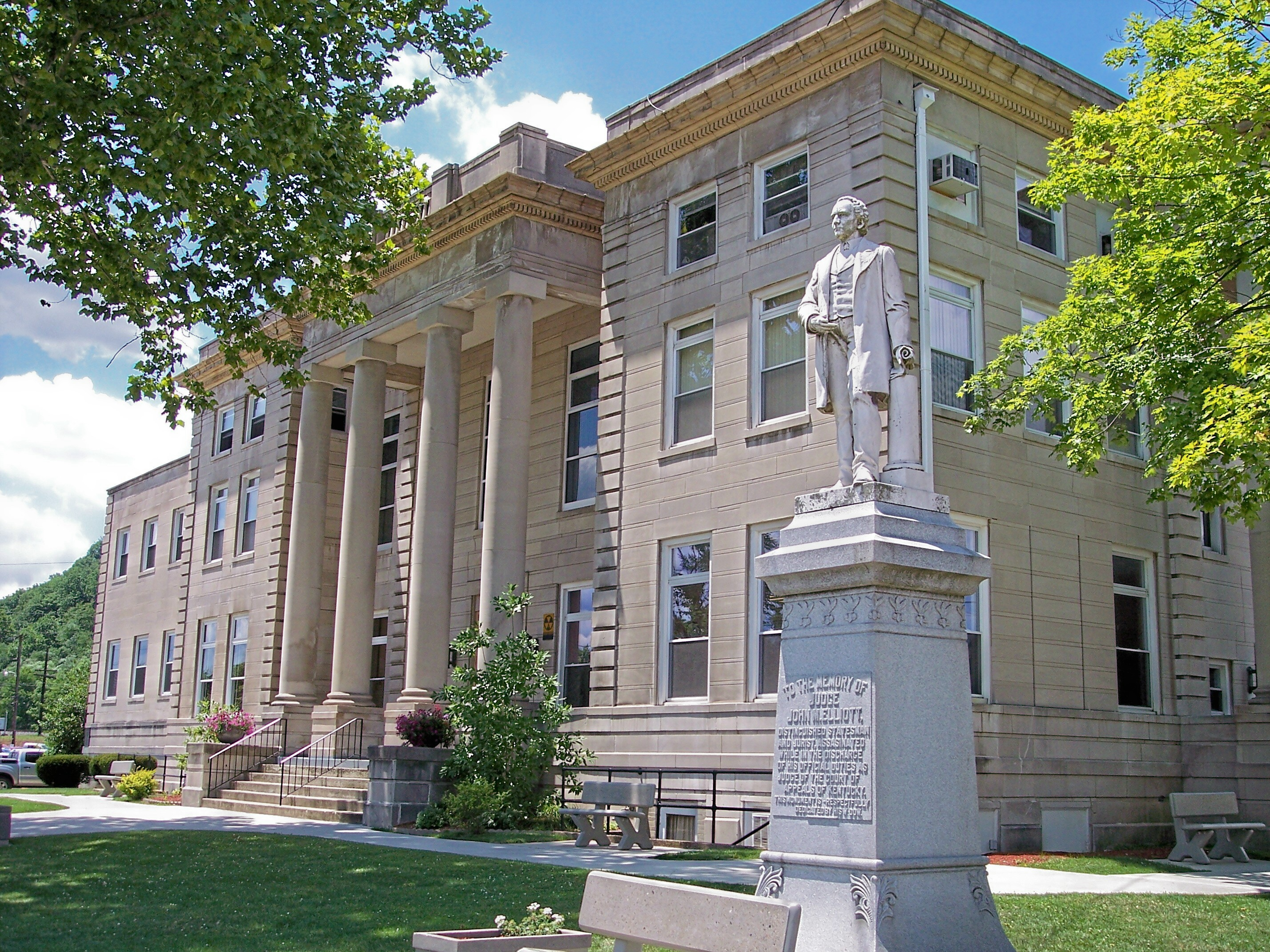
- The Boyd County Courthouse in Catlettsburg, with a statue of John Milton Elliott
- Motto: Unity and Progress
- Location within the U.S. state of Kentucky
- Coordinates: 38°22′N 82°41′W
- Country: United States
- State: Kentucky
- Founded: 1860
- Named for: Linn Boyd
- Seat: Catlettsburg
- Largest city: Ashland

Government
  - Judge/Executive: Eric Chaney (R)

Area
  - Total: 162 sq mi (420 km^{2})
  - Land: 160 sq mi (410 km^{2})
  - Water: 2.2 sq mi (5.7 km^{2}) 1.3%

Population (2020)
  - Total: 48,261
  - Estimate (2025): 47,751 ▼
  - Density: 300/sq mi (120/km^{2})
- Time zone: UTC−5 (Eastern)
  - Summer (DST): UTC−4 (EDT)
- Congressional districts: 4th, 5th
- Website: boydcountyky.gov

Boyd County is a county located in the U.S. Commonwealth of Kentucky. As of the 2020 census, its population was 48,261. The county seat is Catlettsburg, and its largest city is Ashland. The county was formed in 1860. The county spans 160 square miles (410 km^{2}), and is found at the northeastern edge of the state, near the Ohio River and Big Sandy River and situated in mountainous Appalachia. Boyd County is in the Huntington-Ashland, WV-KY-OH metropolitan statistical area.

== History ==
Boyd County was the 107th of 120 counties formed in Kentucky and was established in 1860 from parts of surrounding Greenup, Carter, and Lawrence Counties. It was named for Linn Boyd of Paducah, former U.S. congressman, speaker of the United States House of Representatives, who died in 1859 soon after being elected lieutenant governor of Kentucky.

The earliest evidence of human habitation in Boyd County exists in the forms of numerous earthen mounds containing human skeletons and burial goods, giving evidence that prehistoric Native Americans inhabited the area. A 1973 archeological find revealed a serpent-shaped mound built of rocks dating to 2000 BC and stretching for 900 feet (270 m) along a ridge parallel to the Big Sandy River south of Catlettsburg.

One of the early settlers in what is now Boyd County was Charles ("One-handed Charley") Smith, from Virginia. A veteran of the French and Indian War who had served under Col. George Washington in 1754, Smith received for that service roughly 400 acres (1.6 km^{2}) around Chadwicks Creek, where he built a cabin in 1774. Smith died in 1776, and in 1797, this land passed to Alexander Catlett for whom the town of Catlettsburg is named.

The Poage family arrived from Staunton, Virginia, in October 1799 and formed Poage's Landing, later renamed the city of Ashland.

The first courthouse built in 1861 was replaced in 1912.

=== Industry ===
Members of the Poage family built the steam-powered Clinton iron furnace in 1832, the earliest industry in present-day Boyd County. A total of 29 charcoal-fueled iron furnaces operated on the Kentucky side of the Ohio River, seven of them in present-day Boyd County.

The Kentucky Iron, Coal and Manufacturing Company was incorporated on March 8, 1854, and it laid out the town of Ashland, then within Greenup County. The company purchased thousands of acres of coal, timber, and ore lands throughout the county. It invested US$210,000 in bonds of the Lexington & Big Sandy River Railroad Company, with the stipulation that the eastern division of that line extend into Ashland instead of ending, as originally planned, in Catlettsburg. The early presence of the railroad in Ashland was largely responsible for this city becoming the dominant municipality of the county.

Ashland furnace was sold to American Rolling Mill Company in 1921, which developed into Armco Steel Corporation. In 1963, Armco constructed the Amanda furnace, one of the largest blast furnaces in the world. Armco later merged with Kawasaki Steel, becoming AK Steel; in 2020 Cleveland-Cliffs acquired AK Steel. The industry remains a major employer in northeastern Kentucky.

Ashland Oil, Inc., at one time the largest corporation headquartered in Kentucky, was started in 1924 at Leach Station, south of Catlettsburg, by Paul G. Blazer. Best known for their Valvoline Oil products, Ashland Oil relocated to Covington, Kentucky, in 1999, merged with Marathon Oil, and sold its remaining petroleum shares to Marathon in 2005, dissolving their petroleum division. The original oil refinery, located in Catlettsburg, is still in operation today and is currently owned by Marathon Petroleum Corporation.

Calgon Carbon constructed the Big Sandy Plant in 1961 and it has since become the world's largest producer of granular activated carbon. The facility produces in excess of 100 million pounds of granular activated carbon annually.

=== Alcohol sales ===
On November 3, 2020, residents voted in favor of allowing full retail sales of alcohol countywide. Prior to November 2020, Boyd County only allowed alcohol sales in restaurants that seated over 100 people and derived at least 70% of their income from food sales. The one exception was three election precincts within the city of Ashland, covering the downtown area, where all retail alcohol sales were permitted.

== Geography ==
According to the United States Census Bureau, the county has a total area of 162 square miles (420 km^{2}), of which 2.2 square miles (5.7 km^{2}) (1.3%) are covered by water.

=== Adjacent counties ===
- Greenup County (northwest)
- Lawrence County, Ohio (northeast)
- Wayne County, West Virginia (east)
- Lawrence County (south)
- Carter County (west)

Boyd County is one of the few counties in the US to border two counties of the same name in different states (Lawrence County in Kentucky and Ohio). - -

== Demographics ==
Historical population
Census	Pop.	Note	%±
1870	8,573		—
1880	12,165		41.9%
1890	14,033		15.4%
1900	18,834		34.2%
1910	23,444		24.5%
1920	29,281		24.9%
1930	43,849		49.8%
1940	45,938		4.8%
1950	49,949		8.7%
1960	52,163		4.4%
1970	52,376		0.4%
1980	55,513		6.0%
1990	51,150		−7.9%
2000	49,752		−2.7%
2010	49,542		−0.4%
2020	48,261		−2.6%
2025 (est.)	47,751	▼	−1.1%
U.S. Decennial Census; 1790-1960 1900-1990; 1990-2000 2010-2020

=== 2020 census ===
As of the 2020 census, the county had a population of 48,261. The median age was 43.0 years. 21.3% of residents were under the age of 18 and 19.8% of residents were 65 years of age or older. For every 100 females there were 97.4 males, and for every 100 females age 18 and over there were 95.7 males age 18 and over.

The racial makeup of the county was 91.8% White, 2.7% Black or African American, 0.2% American Indian and Alaska Native, 0.6% Asian, 0.0% Native Hawaiian and Pacific Islander, 0.6% from some other race, and 4.1% from two or more races. Hispanic or Latino residents of any race comprised 1.5% of the population.

76.2% of residents lived in urban areas, while 23.8% lived in rural areas.

There were 19,296 households in the county, of which 28.9% had children under the age of 18 living with them and 29.3% had a female householder with no spouse or partner present. About 29.4% of all households were made up of individuals and 13.1% had someone living alone who was 65 years of age or older.

There were 21,742 housing units, of which 11.3% were vacant. Among occupied housing units, 67.0% were owner-occupied and 33.0% were renter-occupied. The homeowner vacancy rate was 2.5% and the rental vacancy rate was 9.4%.

=== 2000 census ===
As of the census of 2000, 49,752 people, 20,010 households, and 14,107 families were residing in the county. The population density was 311 per square mile (120/km^{2}). The 21,976 housing units had an average density of 137 per square mile (53/km^{2}). The racial makeup of the county was 95.97% White, 2.55% African American, 0.16% Native American, 0.30% Asian, 0.14% from other races, and 0.88% from two or more races. About 1.12% of the population were Hispanics or Latinos of any race.

Of the 20,010 households, 28.9% had children under 18 living with them, 55.7% were married couples living together, 11.6% had a female householder with no husband present, and 29.5% were not families. About 26.5% of all households were made up of individuals, and 12.2% had someone living alone who was 65 or older. The average household size was 2.38, and the average family size was 2.86.

The age distribution was 21.80% under 18, 8.30% from 18 to 24, 28.70% from 25 to 44, 25.60% from 45 to 64, and 15.60% who were 65 or older. The median age was 40 years. For every 100 females, there were 96.00 males. For every 100 females 18 and over, there were 93.1 males.

The median income for a household in the county was $32,749, and for a family was $41,125. Males had a median income of $35,728 versus $22,591 for females. The per capita income for the county was $18,212. About 11.5% of families and 15.5% of the population were below the poverty line, including 22.4% of those under 18 and 12.10% of those 65 or over.

== Infrastructure ==
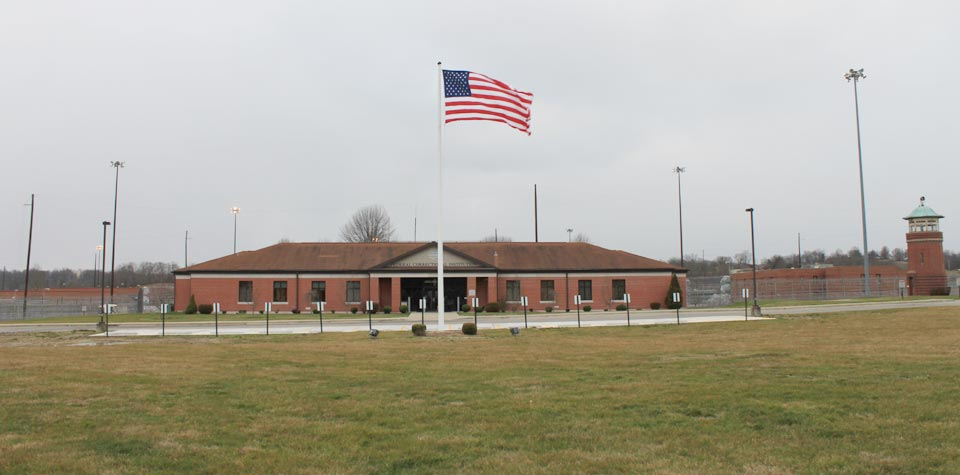
Federal Correctional Institution, Ashland

The Federal Bureau of Prisons operates the Federal Correctional Institution, Ashland in Summit, unincorporated Boyd County, 5 miles (8.0 km) southwest of Ashland.

Kentucky State Police Post 14 is located on U.S. 60 in Summit, next to Armco Park. In addition to Boyd County, troopers from Post 14 serve Carter, Greenup, and Lawrence Counties.

== Politics ==
United States presidential election results for Boyd County, Kentucky
Year	Republican		Democratic		Third party(ies)	
Year	No.	%	No.	%	No.	%
1912	1,271	28.11%	1,772	39.19%	1,478	32.69%
1916	2,883	50.20%	2,738	47.68%	122	2.12%
1920	6,334	54.78%	5,103	44.13%	126	1.09%
1924	6,062	55.55%	4,079	37.38%	772	7.07%
1928	9,118	66.38%	4,611	33.57%	7	0.05%
1932	6,853	44.67%	8,315	54.19%	175	1.14%
1936	6,650	40.32%	9,762	59.19%	80	0.49%
1940	7,322	42.41%	9,868	57.16%	75	0.43%
1944	6,868	45.66%	8,130	54.06%	42	0.28%
1948	6,707	41.98%	9,006	56.38%	262	1.64%
1952	10,426	50.32%	10,245	49.44%	49	0.24%
1956	11,502	57.28%	8,546	42.56%	34	0.17%
1960	11,305	55.42%	9,094	44.58%	0	0.00%
1964	6,941	37.65%	11,436	62.03%	60	0.33%
1968	8,632	45.43%	7,914	41.65%	2,455	12.92%
1972	12,812	65.92%	6,434	33.10%	191	0.98%
1976	9,106	44.51%	11,150	54.50%	203	0.99%
1980	10,367	47.79%	10,702	49.33%	626	2.89%
1984	10,925	52.98%	9,601	46.56%	95	0.46%
1988	9,379	49.39%	9,552	50.31%	57	0.30%
1992	7,387	34.93%	10,496	49.63%	3,264	15.43%
1996	7,054	37.34%	9,668	51.17%	2,171	11.49%
2000	9,247	48.21%	9,541	49.74%	394	2.05%
2004	11,501	52.81%	10,132	46.53%	144	0.66%
2008	11,430	55.30%	8,886	42.99%	354	1.71%
2012	10,884	57.14%	7,776	40.82%	389	2.04%
2016	13,591	66.45%	6,021	29.44%	842	4.12%
2020	14,295	65.72%	7,083	32.56%	373	1.71%
2024	14,363	68.56%	6,291	30.03%	297	1.42%

Similar to many other Eastern Kentucky counties, Boyd County voted primarily for Democratic candidates at the presidential level before shifting hard to the right in the 2000s. However, local Democratic support remains strong, as Democrat Andy Beshear won the county by about 6 points over incumbent Republican Matt Bevin in the 2019 gubernatorial election.

=== Elected officials ===
==== State and Federal ====
Elected officials as of May 30, 2025
U.S. House	Hal Rogers (R)	KY 5
Ky. Senate	Robin L. Webb (R)	18
Ky. House	Patrick Flannery (R)	96
Ky. House	Aaron Thompson (R)	98
Ky. House	Scott Sharp (R)	100

==== County ====
Elected officials as of January 2, 2023
Judge/Executive	Eric Chaney (R)
Commissioner District 1	James David Salisbury II (R)
Commissioner District 2	Jeremy K. Holbrook (R)
Commissioner District 3	Randy Stapleton (R)
Clerk	Kevin Johnston (R)
Attorney	Curtis E. Dotson (R)
Jailer	William Bill Hensley (R)
Coroner	Mark Hammond (R)
Surveyor	Larry C. Barker Jr. (R)
Property Value Admin.	Homer Jay Woods Jr. (R)
Sheriff	James "Jamie" Reihs (R)

==== Judicial ====
Elected officials as of January 6, 2025
Ky. Supreme Court, District 7	Robert B. Conley
Ky. Court of Appeal, District 7, Division 1	Sara Walter Combs
Ky. Court of Appeals, District 7, Division 2	Larry E. Thompson
Commonwealth's Attorney	Rhonda Copley (R)
Circuit Court Clerk	Mary Hall Sergent (R)
32nd Circuit, 1st division	George W. Davis III
32nd Circuit, 2nd division	John Vincent
32nd District, 1st division	Scott T. Reese
32nd District, 2nd division	Devon Reams

=== Voter registration ===
Boyd County Voter Registration & Party Enrollment as of April 30, 2025
Political Party	Total Voters	Percentage
Republican	16,272	46.68%
Democratic	14,591	41.86%
Independent	2,380	6.83%
Others	1,380	3.96%
Libertarian	193	0.55%
Green	18	0.05%
Constitution	16	0.05%
Total	34,856	100%

== Education ==
=== Colleges ===
Ashland Community and Technical College, in Ashland, is one of 16 two-year, open-admissions colleges of the Kentucky Community and Technical College System. Morehead State University also has a satellite campus located in Ashland.

=== Public school districts ===
The county has these school districts:

- Boyd County Public School District serves the city of Catlettsburg and the surrounding county communities outside the city of Ashland and Westwood census-designated place, as well as portions of Ashland and portions of Westwood.
- Ashland Independent School District serves most of the city of Ashland and some unincorporated areas.
- Fairview Independent School District serves most of the census-designated place of Westwood and a portion of Ashland.

=== Private schools ===
- Holy Family School is affiliated with the Holy Family Catholic Church and currently offers K-12 education.
- Rose Hill Christian is affiliated with the Rose Hill Baptist Church and also offers K-12 education.
- Calvary Christian School was housed at Grassland Community Church until it closed in August 2012. A group of parents and teachers continued the school immediately following the closure, formed a new board, and renamed it Faith Christian Academy, which continued for an additional three school years in grades K4 - 8 and was affiliated with the Holy Family Collegiate High School for grades 9 - 12. It formally closed in fall 2016.

=== Other schools ===
- Ramey-Estep High School

== Communities ==
=== Cities ===
- Ashland
- Catlettsburg (county seat)

=== Census-designated places ===
- Cannonsburg
- Ironville
- Westwood

=== Unincorporated communities ===
- Burnaugh
- Coalton
- Durbin
- England Hill
- Garner
- Kavanaugh
- Kilgore
- Lockwood
- Meads
- Normal
- Princess
- Rockdale
- Rush (Shared with Carter County)
- Summit
- Unity
- Winslow

There is also a ghost town called Neal inside the county. Neal used to be a mining town beginning in the 1920s. After World War II, it became abandoned due to the closure of mines in the town.

== See also ==
- Ashland Commercial Historic District
- Catlett House
- National Register of Historic Places listings in Boyd County, Kentucky
