= Catlettsburg, Kentucky =

- City
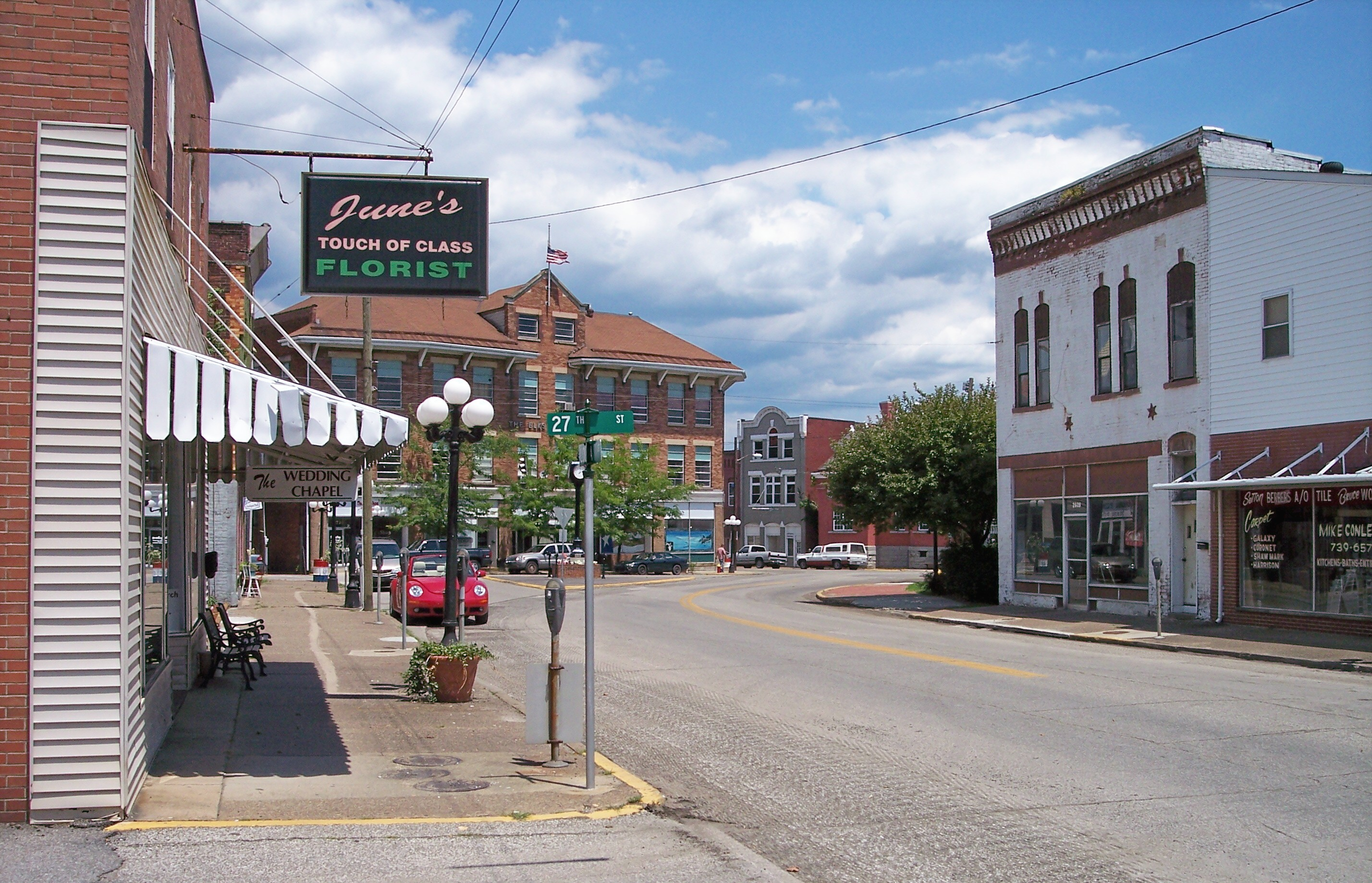
- Louisa Street in downtown Catlettsburg in 2007

- Location of Catlettsburg in Boyd County, Kentucky.

- Location within Kentucky Location within the United States
- Coordinates: 38°24′17″N 82°36′02″W
- Country: United States
- State: Kentucky
- County: Boyd

Government
  - Mayor: Faith Day

Area
  - Total: 1.73 sq mi (4.49 km^{2})
  - Land: 1.34 sq mi (3.46 km^{2})
  - Water: 0.40 sq mi (1.04 km^{2})
- Elevation: 554 ft (169 m)

Population (2020)
  - Total: 1,780
  - Estimate (2022): 1,746
  - Density: 1,334.3/sq mi (515.17/km^{2})
- Time zone: UTC-5 (EST)
  - Summer (DST): UTC-4 (EDT)
- ZIP code: 41129
- Area code: 606
- FIPS code: 21-13420
- GNIS feature ID: 0489094
- Website: www.catlettsburg.us

Catlettsburg is a home rule-class city in and the county seat of Boyd County, Kentucky, United States. The population was 1,780 at the 2020 census. It is part of the Huntington–Ashland metropolitan area.

== History ==
=== Early history ===
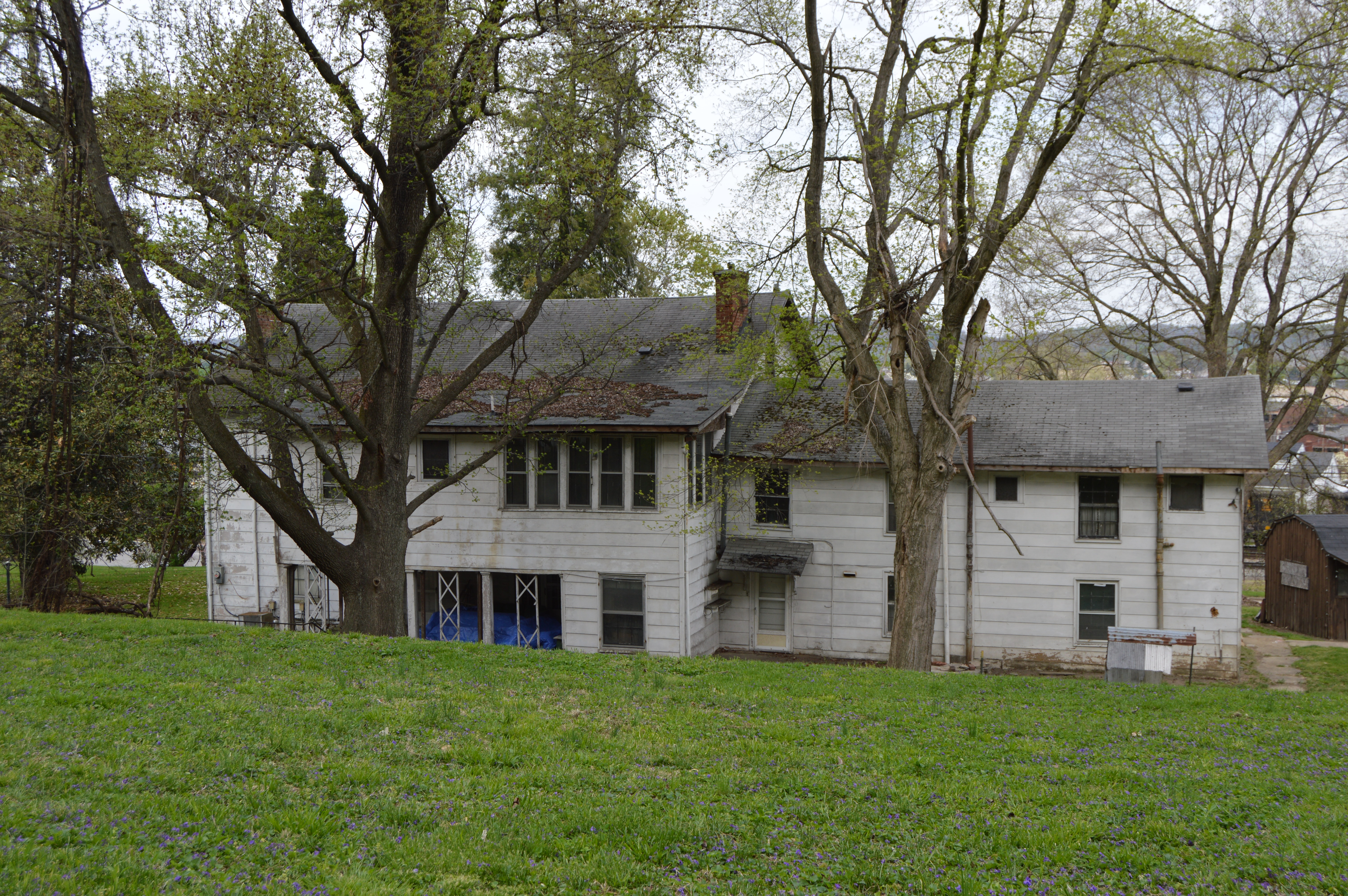
The Catlett House was built in 1812.

Catlettsburg's history begins in the decades directly following the American Revolution, as many frontiersmen passed through the area on their western trek along the Ohio River. Alexander Catlett, the first landowner of the area, came to the site in 1798. His son, Horatio Catlett, opened a post office on December 5, 1810, with himself being the postmaster. This was the first known use of the name Catlettsburg being used officially as it had been previously known as Mouth of Sandy. In 1849, James Wilson Fry, a landowner who purchased the site from the Catlett family in 1833, sold off town lots of what was soon to be the town of Catlettsburg. (The Kentucky Encyclopedia says the Catletts settled the area in 1798.) and Catletts resided at the location until 1847. After establishing this settlement, the Catletts operated a business that consisted of a tavern, post office, trading post, and inn, out of a log structure they built from virgin timber about 1811. Due to its location along the route of the American frontier, the Catletts provided hospitality to such notable patrons as General Stonewall Jackson, Henry Clay, Felix Grundy, and future U.S. President James Garfield. Catering to the ever-growing river traffic, the Catlett business flourished and the present-day town grew up around it. Collis P. Huntington operated the Chesapeake and Ohio Railway. Its line to Cincinnati was built from Huntington in 1888. This required the construction of the railroad bridge that crosses the Big Sandy River at Catlettsburg, which carries an average of 80 trains daily.

The Catlett House is still standing two hundred years later and has long been used as the "servants' quarters" of Beechmoor Place, a large home located on Walnut Street (U.S. Routes 23 and 60). C.W. Culver bought the property from the Catlett heirs and built a large home of the Georgian style on the right of the Catletts' original dwelling. About 1868, Col. Laban T. Moore bought the estate from C.W. Culver for $10,000 ($171,000 in 2011). Col. Moore was noted as a former member of the U.S. House of Representatives and had previously served as a captain in the Kentucky Volunteer Infantry. He named his home Beechmoor, a portmanteau of his surname and that of a magnificent beech that stood on the fertile grounds at the time. Ownership of Beechmoor has remained in the Moore family since 1868. Beechmoor's eastern wing, being 200 years old and built by the Catletts, is cited as the oldest known building in a 300-mile radius. Built of Kentucky's virgin hemlock maple (now virtually extinct), the exterior walls are between 9 and 12 inches thick. The main portion has a stone foundation, and is held up by the same virgin timber, each 64 feet (20 m) in diameter, and running the entire 42-foot (13 m) width of the house. Beechmoor's last full-time resident, Rebecca Patton, Col. L.T. Moore's granddaughter, was dedicated to Beechmoor's preservation during her lifetime. In 1973, she had her lifelong home listed on the National Register of Historic Places and made provisions to ensure the home would be maintained in the event of her demise. She died in 1986. Since then, it has been maintained by proceeds from a trust fund and rental property income. A paid caretaker lives on the property full-time as of 2011. Several attempts have been made by local civic groups to acquire the property as a museum or civic use property due to its historical significance to the area but have not been successful as of this time, due to the family's desire to retain ownership.

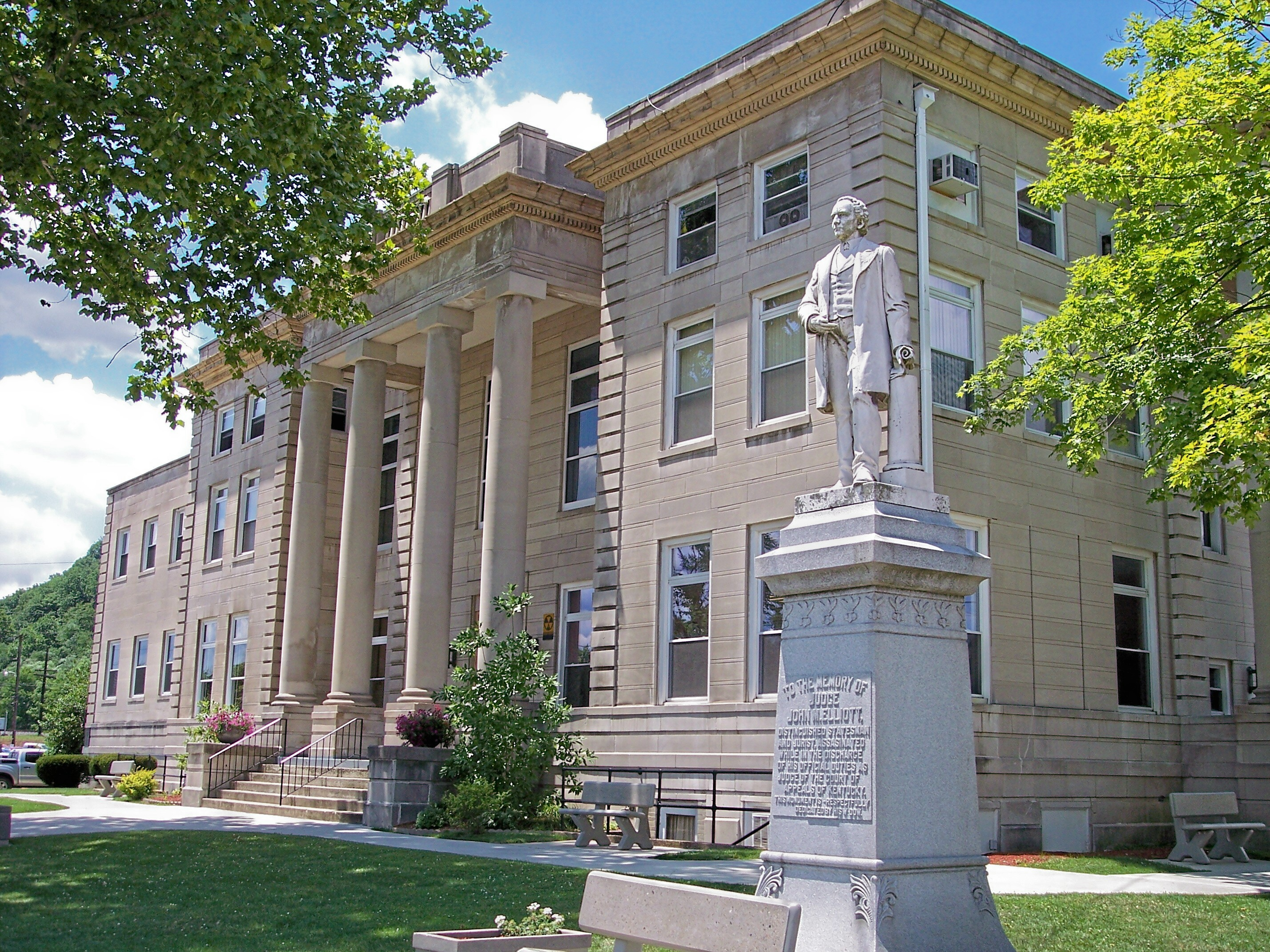
The Boyd County Courthouse in Catlettsburg, with a statue of John Milton Elliott

The Catlett name is still used on a tributary to the Ohio River, Catlett's Creek, which follows Kentucky Route 168 for many miles west of the city. Catlettsburg annexed two nearby communities on its borders in the late 19th century: Hampton City to the south side and Sandy City to the north.

The spelling of the city's name was changed to Catlettsburg from the previous spelling of Catlett's Burg c. 1890.

Catlettsburg served as a Union Army supply depot during the Civil War. The First Presbyterian Church, 26th and Broadway, served as an army hospital during the war. The church building still serves the congregation of the Presbyterian church in Catlettsburg. The current church, built in 1875, is one of two truly gothic buildings still standing in the U.S. The church is of mid-to-late 19th century Grecian design, with most original fixtures in place, and is sometimes used for wedding ceremonies.

The Catlettsburg National Bank building used to sit at the corner of Center and Division/26th streets was listed on the National Register, but has been demolished due to the structure being unstable.

Beginning in the late 19th century and lasting until the early 1920s, Catlettsburg was the largest hardwood timber market in the world due to its location at the mouth of the Big Sandy River. Due to the profitability of harvesting such hardwoods, most all virgin timber that existed for several miles around Catlettsburg was felled during that period. Very few trees of desirable breeds such as oak were left standing once the boom was over, mostly to mark private property lines. One known exception to history's hardwood harvest is the existence of a large oak, standing on a knob in the Hampton City section. With its origins dating to circa 1760, it measures 246 inches (6.2 m) in diameter. It is the oldest known living tree of any breed within the city limits and for many miles surrounding the city. There is also a hemlock maple tree (which measures over 350 inches in diameter) located on the same property, one of very few that remain in North America as they were all but extinct due to their heavy usage in home construction from 1750 to 1925.

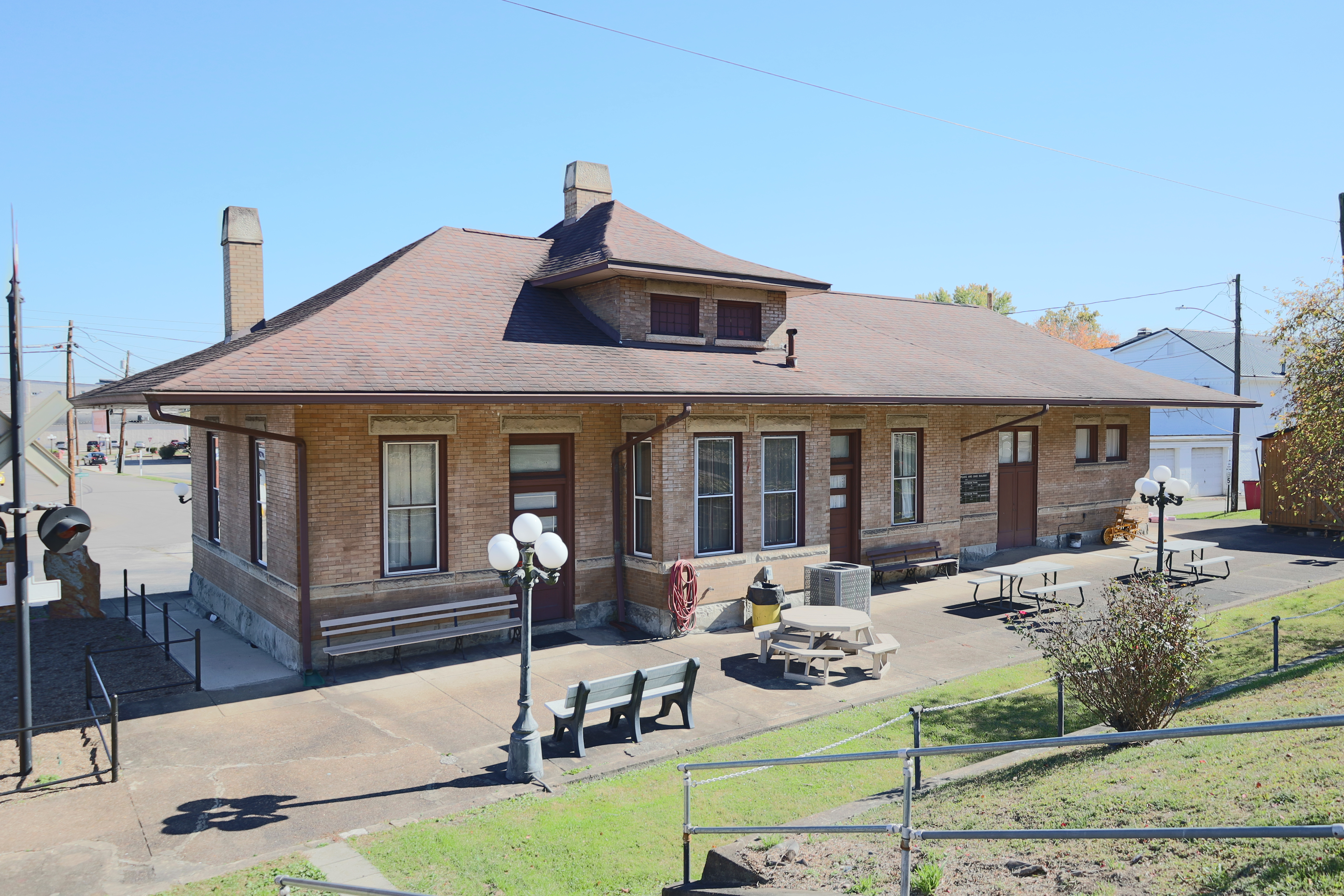
The former Catlettsburg C&O rail station in 2023

Rail transportation began to slowly replace the river's prominence as a mode of transportation as the Chesapeake & Ohio (C&O) railroad began construction of a bridge across the Big Sandy River linking Catlettsburg with Kenova, West Virginia in 1885. The bridge is still traversed by trains many times each day, as a part of CSX Transportation's (formerly C & O Railway) main operations. Known by railroad enthusiasts and historians from around the world, it is unique in design and historic value for its longevity. The bridge is also used by Amtrak's Cardinal passenger train, train numbers 50 (eastbound, toward Huntington) and 51 (westbound, toward Ashland), which carries passengers from Chicago to New York City. The Chatteroi railroad preceded the C & O by a few years as the first rail line to travel through Catlettsburg's city limits, as it followed the Big Sandy River north from the coal fields to Ashland.

The Chesapeake & Ohio Railway built a passenger depot in Catlettsburg in 1906 and operated the facility for over 52 years until 1958 when passenger service was transferred to nearby Ashland. After closing the facility, C & O sold it to the city of Catlettsburg for $1. The city has maintained it and used it as a civic center since that time. In 2006, longtime Catlettsburg businessman and politician Russell Compton donated his own personal funds for the restoration of the train depot so it could be restored to its original appearance. Intensive restoration of the depot is now complete, featuring the original directional signage, etc. The facility was renamed the Russell Compton Community Center in 2007 in his honor. In 2010, Compton donated the necessary funds to restore an old C & O caboose to its original appearance. It is now parked on the side of the depot facility.

== Geography ==
Catlettsburg is located 38°24′59″N 82°36′10″W (38.416273, -82.602762).

According to the United States Census Bureau, the city has a total area of 1.6 square miles (4.1 km^{2}), of which 1.3 square miles (3.4 km^{2}) is land and 0.4 square miles (1.0 km^{2}) (22.42%) is water.

== Demographics ==
Historical population
Census	Pop.	Note	%±
1870	1,019		—
1880	1,225		20.2%
1890	1,374		12.2%
1900	3,081		124.2%
1910	3,520		14.2%
1920	4,183		18.8%
1930	5,025		20.1%
1940	4,524		−10.0%
1950	4,750		5.0%
1960	3,874		−18.4%
1970	3,420		−11.7%
1980	3,005		−12.1%
1990	2,231		−25.8%
2000	1,960		−12.1%
2010	1,856		−5.3%
2020	1,780		−4.1%
2022 (est.)	1,746		−1.9%
U.S. Decennial Census

=== 2020 census ===
As of the 2020 census, Catlettsburg had a population of 1,780. The median age was 41.5 years. 16.6% of residents were under the age of 18 and 19.1% of residents were 65 years of age or older. For every 100 females there were 113.9 males, and for every 100 females age 18 and over there were 113.1 males age 18 and over.

100.0% of residents lived in urban areas, while 0.0% lived in rural areas.

There were 711 households in Catlettsburg, of which 26.0% had children under the age of 18 living in them. Of all households, 32.8% were married-couple households, 24.9% were households with a male householder and no spouse or partner present, and 34.5% were households with a female householder and no spouse or partner present. About 38.6% of all households were made up of individuals and 17.9% had someone living alone who was 65 years of age or older.

There were 856 housing units, of which 16.9% were vacant. The homeowner vacancy rate was 2.3% and the rental vacancy rate was 11.8%.

Racial composition as of the 2020 census
Race	Number	Percent
White	1,676	94.2%
Black or African American	30	1.7%
American Indian and Alaska Native	2	0.1%
Asian	10	0.6%
Native Hawaiian and Other Pacific Islander	0	0.0%
Some other race	10	0.6%
Two or more races	52	2.9%
Hispanic or Latino (of any race)	17	1.0%

=== 2000 census ===
As of the census of 2000, there were 1,960 people, 827 households, and 519 families residing in the city. The population density was 1,528.8 inhabitants per square mile (590.3/km^{2}). There were 959 housing units at an average density of 748.0 per square mile (288.8/km^{2}). The racial makeup of the city was 98.16% White, 1.12% African American, 0.20% Native American, 0.05% from other races, and 0.46% from two or more races. Hispanic or Latino of any race were 0.10% of the population.

There were 827 households, out of which 23.9% had children under the age of 18 living with them, 45.0% were married couples living together, 13.3% had a female householder with no husband present, and 37.2% were non-families. 34.0% of all households were made up of individuals, and 17.0% had someone living alone who was 65 years of age or older. The average household size was 2.25 and the average family size was 2.85.

In the city the population was spread out, with 20.4% under the age of 18, 10.4% from 18 to 24, 28.1% from 25 to 44, 24.2% from 45 to 64, and 16.9% who were 65 years of age or older. The median age was 38 years. For every 100 females, there were 94.8 males. For every 100 females age 18 and over, there were 92.7 males.

The median income for a household in the city was $24,167, and the median income for a family was $34,118. Males had a median income of $26,683 versus $24,107 for females. The per capita income for the city was $13,682. About 15.1% of families and 21.6% of the population were below the poverty line, including 28.3% of those under age 18 and 16.7% of those age 65 or over.

== Education ==
The Catlettsburg Independent School District was merged with the Boyd County School District in 1974. Until that time, the city had three elementary schools serving grades K-8 and one high school. After the merger, the Catlettsburg High School campus, which was built in 1965, became Catlettsburg Junior High, serving grades 7–9. Haney Elementary was closed and students then attended Yost Elementary. Hatfield Elementary remained open. At the close of the 1979–80 school year, Yost Elementary was closed and students were transferred to Hatfield, where a new school building replaced the former. It was then renamed Catlettsburg Elementary. At the time of its closing in 1980, Yost Elementary School was the oldest operating school building in the state of Kentucky and one of the oldest in the United States. It was first constructed in 1894 as the Catlettsburg Public School and served all twelve grades for many years before becoming a grade school. Students in grades 10-12 were transferred to Boyd County High School in 1974. At the end of the 1992–93 school year, the junior high was merged with Summit Junior High (now Boyd County Middle School). Since then, Catlettsburg Elementary has been the only school within the city limits, and uses the campus of the former high school/jr. high school at 3380 Court Street. The gymnasium of Catlettsburg Elementary was built many years before the school buildings that surround it. Part of the New Deal, it was constructed by the Works Progress Administration in 1935. The Catlettsburg High School was added onto it in 1965, and now serves as the elementary school's gymnasium, which hosts many civic events such as the Catlettsburg Miss Flame Pageant that feeds into the Miss Kentucky Pageant and Miss America system. In 1991, Ponderosa Elementary School began educating students when it was constructed at Ponderosa Estates.

Catlettsburg has a public library, a branch of the Boyd County Public Library.

== Notable people ==
- Billy C. Clark, former writer, which had its rights sold to The Walt Disney Company
- Mary Elliott Flanery, first female state legislator elected in Kentucky
- Ed Haley, former fiddler
- Nannie Scott Honshell, former ironmaster
- George B. Martin, former U.S. Senator
- Laban T. Moore, former U.S. House of Representatives
- Michael Polakovs, clown who revamped Ronald McDonald character
- Charlie Snyder, former head coach for Marshall Thundering Herd football
- Ben Williamson, former U.S. Senator

== See also ==
- List of cities and towns along the Ohio River
