= National Register of Historic Places listings in Boyd County, Kentucky =

Location of Boyd County in Kentucky

This is a list of the National Register of Historic Places listings in Boyd County, Kentucky.

This is intended to be a complete list of the properties and districts on the National Register of Historic Places in Boyd County, Kentucky, United States. The locations of National Register properties and districts for which the latitude and longitude coordinates are included below, may be seen in a map.

There are 27 properties and districts listed on the National Register in the county. Another 2 properties were once listed but have been removed.

This National Park Service list is complete through NPS recent listings posted May 22, 2026.

== Current listings ==
	Name on the Register	Image	Date listed	Location	City or town	Description
1	Ashland Armory	Ashland Armory	September 6, 2002 (#02000920)	2519 Lexington Ave. 38°28′06″N 82°37′52″W	Ashland	
2	Ashland Coal and Iron Railroad Office	Ashland Coal and Iron Railroad Office	July 3, 1979 (#79003565)	1100 Front St. 38°28′58″N 82°38′39″W	Ashland	
3	Ashland Coal and Iron Railroad Store	Ashland Coal and Iron Railroad Store	July 3, 1979 (#79003553)	900 Front St. 38°29′03″N 82°38′45″W	Ashland	
4	Ashland Commercial Historic District	Ashland Commercial Historic District	August 5, 1994 (#94000838)	Roughly bounded by 13th St., Carter Ave., 18th St. and Front St. 38°28′46″N 82°38′23″W	Ashland	Includes the Camayo Arcade.
5	Ashland Tuberculosis Hospital	Ashland Tuberculosis Hospital	February 7, 2008 (#08000002)	3700 Landsdowne Dr. 38°27′11″N 82°40′04″W	Ashland	
6	Alexander Bagby House	Alexander Bagby House	July 3, 1979 (#79003561)	1520 Lexington Ave. 38°28′27″N 82°38′38″W	Ashland	
7	Bath Avenue Historic District	Bath Avenue Historic District	July 3, 1979 (#79003552)	Bath Ave. from 13th to 17th Sts. 38°28′35″N 82°38′35″W	Ashland	Includes the Mayo Mansion.
8	Catlett House	Catlett House	May 25, 1973 (#73000788)	25th and Walnut Sts. 38°25′01″N 82°36′02″W	Catlettsburg	
9	Catlettsburg Elementary School		April 3, 2026 (#100012877)	3380 Court St. 38°24′24″N 82°36′05″W	Catlettsburg	
10	Catlettsburg, Kentucky, Chesapeake and Ohio Railway Depot	Catlettsburg, Kentucky, Chesapeake and Ohio Railway Depot	August 6, 2012 (#12000446)	Junction of Division (26th) and Panola Sts. 38°25′01″N 82°35′58″W	Catlettsburg	
11	Catlettsburg National Bank	Catlettsburg National Bank	May 25, 1973 (#73000789)	110 26th St. 38°25′02″N 82°35′50″W	Catlettsburg	Demolished
12	Henry Clay Hotel	Henry Clay Hotel	August 3, 1984 (#84001383)	1736 Winchester Ave. 38°28′39″N 82°38′16″W	Ashland	
13	Crump and Field Grocery Company	Crump and Field Grocery Company	July 3, 1979 (#79003556)	1401-1405 Greenup Ave. 38°28′51″N 82°38′26″W	Ashland	
14	Culbertson House	Culbertson House	July 3, 1979 (#79003560)	1520 Chestnut Dr. 38°28′26″N 82°38′42″W	Ashland	
15	Nando Felty Saloon	Nando Felty Saloon	July 3, 1979 (#79003557)	1500 Front St. 38°28′51″N 82°38′21″W	Ashland	No longer at site.
16	Timothy Fields House	Timothy Fields House	July 3, 1979 (#79003562)	1600 Central Ave. 38°28′35″N 82°38′28″W	Ashland	
17	First Christian Church of Ashland	First Christian Church of Ashland	March 22, 1990 (#90000475)	315 17th St. 38°28′40″N 82°38′21″W	Ashland	
18	First Presbyterian Church	First Presbyterian Church	June 19, 1973 (#73000787)	1600 Winchester Ave. 38°28′42″N 82°38′22″W	Ashland	
19	First United Methodist Church	First United Methodist Church	November 19, 1974 (#74000853)	2712 Louisa St. 38°24′58″N 82°35′53″W	Catlettsburg	
20	Martin Hilton House	Martin Hilton House	July 3, 1979 (#79003559)	1314 Hilton Ct. 38°28′29″N 82°38′47″W	Ashland	
21	Indian Mounds in Central Park	Indian Mounds in Central Park	January 21, 1974 (#74000852)	Central Park, Carter Ave. 38°28′29″N 82°38′25″W	Ashland	
22	Paramount Theatre	Paramount Theatre	June 30, 1975 (#75000736)	1304 Winchester Ave. 38°28′48″N 82°38′34″W	Ashland	
23	Lon Rogers House	Lon Rogers House	July 3, 1979 (#79003564)	2008 Lexington Ave. 38°28′17″N 82°38′18″W	Ashland	
24	St. James AME Church	St. James AME Church	July 3, 1979 (#79003555)	12th St. and Carter Ave. 38°28′49″N 82°38′41″W	Ashland	
25	Jacob Savageot House and Saloon	Jacob Savageot House and Saloon	July 3, 1979 (#79003558)	1512 Front St. 38°28′51″N 82°38′21″W	Ashland	
26	Stone Serpent Mound	Stone Serpent Mound	January 21, 1974 (#74000854)	West of the Big Sandy River, south of Catlettsburg; 38°21′31″N 82°36′11″W	Catlettsburg	
27	US Post Office-Ashland	US Post Office-Ashland	November 15, 1988 (#88002617)	1645 Winchester Ave. 38°28′43″N 82°38′19″W	Ashland	

== Former listings ==
	Name on the Register	Image	Date listed	Date removed	Location	City or town	Description
1	Edward Poage House		July 3, 1979 (#79003554)	February 3, 1988	1016 Winchester Ave.	Ashland	
2	Valdenar-Wheeler House		July 3, 1979 (#79003563)	February 3, 1988	2417 Winchester Ave.	Ashland	

== See also ==
- List of National Historic Landmarks in Kentucky
- National Register of Historic Places listings in Kentucky
