= Cityscape of Ashland, Kentucky =

Ashland, Kentucky's central business district

Ashland, Kentucky's central business district extends from 12th Street to 18th Street, and from Carter Avenue to Greenup Avenue. It includes many notable buildings, such as the Paramount Arts Center, the Henry Clay Hotel and the Ashland National Bank Building.

== Notable structures ==
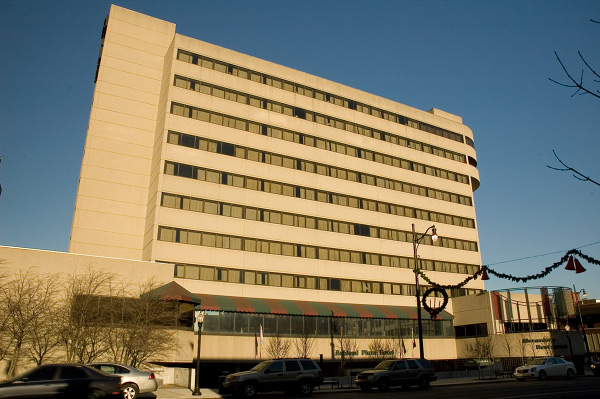
The Ashland Plaza Hotel is a ten-story structure in downtown Ashland.

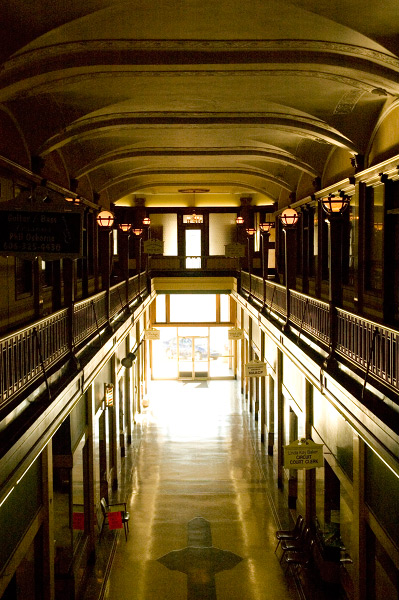
The Camayo Arcade.

The Kitchen Building was constructed in 1915 as an office building on the corner of 15th Street and Winchester Avenue. The Second National Bank, occupied the first floor beginning in 1915 with other offices occupying the other levels.

In 1923, the Ashland Bank Building was constructed at the corner of Winchester Avenue and 16th Street. The 11-story, 116 ft (35 m) tall building was one of the city's tallest structures.

Constructed in 1926, the Camayo Arcade was considered the "finest in the south" by The Paintsville Herald. It is a four-story structure between Winchester Avenue and the alley, and two-stories between the alley and Carter Avenue. The arcade functioned with numerous shops on the first and second levels, and offices on the upper floors. The façade features a three-bay classical arch design and included bronze marquees at each entrance.

Completed on May 14, 1928, the 11-story brick Henry Clay Hotel features classical and renaissance details. Two years later, a five-story structure replaced the existing Kitchen Building, featuring a Beaux-Arts inspired classical façade. In 1932, the bank moved to the former Ashland Bank Building; the building became home of the Stecklers Department Store.

In 1949, Sears purchased the former Field Furniture Building and operated a major department store until 1991.

In 1970, the Camayo Arcade was purchased by the Mayo family and was renamed the Second National Arcade. It has since been renamed back to the Camayo Arcade.

Designed by the Touche, Dinkeloo and Associates, the Kentucky Power Company building was completed in 1976–77. The five-story glass structure, featuring stainless steel accents, includes an underground parking structure and drive-through lanes. Later renamed Park Place, it was then used by American Electric Power, along with numerous offices and a restaurant, before being condemned in 2024.

The Carl D. Perkins Federal Building is a 62,000 sq ft (5,800 m^{2}) federal building. Ground breaking took place on August 19, 1983. The new $8.3 million structure, at the corner of 15th Street and Greenup Avenue, was completed in 1985.

On March 8, 1984, ground breaking took place for a new $8.3 million Quality Royale Hotel at the corner of Winchester Avenue and 15th Street. Envisioned originally in 1980 as a hotel, retail and visitors center at 6th Street where the Ashland Town Center resides today, developers instead chose a downtown location. The ten-story, 160-room structure was completed in September 1985 and was renamed Quality Inn upon opening. The hotel features 112,500 sq ft (10,450 m^{2}) of conference space, a 180-seat restaurant, 100-seat lounge, three ballrooms/dining rooms, two seminar rooms, an indoor pool and sauna and a two-story atrium. The hotel was later known as the Ashland Plaza Hotel before being sold in 2017 to Marriott, who redeveloped it as part of the Delta Hotels chain in 2019.

Today, the Henry Clay Hotel is the Henry Clay House featuring 52 apartments.

== Melody Mountain and Providence Hill ==
On March 20, 2003, it was announced that Melody Mountain would be developed. Overlooking the city to the west, it is bounded by 6th Street, US 23, and a CSX spur. Initial plans were to include a Wal-Mart, Home Depot, O'Charley's, Fire Mountain and Outback Steakhouse, although Fire Mountain and Home Depot later dropped out of the project; Chick-Fil-A was later added to the project. The $30 million Melody Mountain project was destined to be completed in 2005, however, Phase I opened in early 2006. It was financed partially by $3 million in bonds issued by the city.

Construction on the $10 million Phase II project will begin in fall 2007 and be complete by October 2008. It is being financed partially by the city of Ashland through a $1.5 million bond issue. The development will include a 68,000 sq ft (6,300 m^{2}) Kohl's and five smaller retail stores adjacent to Wal-Mart. A 16,000 sq ft (1,500 m^{2}) shopping plaza will be constructed next to the Chick-Fil-A, which will contain at least one restaurant and four businesses.

Adjacent to Melody Mountain across US 23 is the 55-acre (220,000 m^{2}) Providence Hill development project. It was first announced on December 21, 2004 after the land was purchased several days prior for $700,000. On December 15, 2005, ground was broken for the $30 million housing and retail project. Phase one will include nine three-story apartment buildings for a total of 216 units; upon completion, an eight-story condominium complex will be constructed overlooking downtown Ashland and the Ohio River. The final phase includes the completion of an upscale retail and office complex.

Providence Hill is expected to be complete in late-2007.

== Streetscape improvements ==
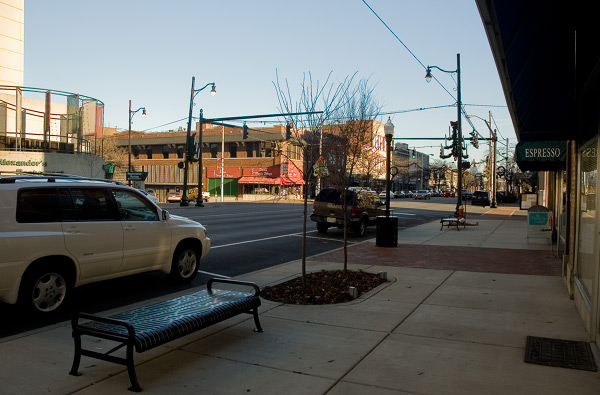
A renovated streetscape, looking east along Winchester Avenue.

On November 11, 2004, Ashland's Main Street program revealed plans for a streetscape project in the central business district. Billed as an economic development that would spur further revitalization of the downtown, the Kentucky's Main Street's initiative is to utilize state funds to restore business districts. The main focus in the plan is on Winchester Avenue which includes,

- Narrowing Winchester Avenue between 13th Street and 18th Street to two-lanes,
- Constructing new sidewalks and removing basements under city right-of-way,
- Burying utilities,
- Installing new traffic-signal mast-arms,
- Installing new period street lights,
- Retrofitting existing street lights with period street lamps,
- Planting new trees and vegetation in "pocket parks."

Tinted concrete was to be used at crosswalks, but this was changed to brick due to concerns about future maintenance problems.

The city received $850,000 in state grants in 2004 to jump start construction on a segment from 13th to 14th Streets along Winchester Avenue. In 2005, construction extended to 15th Street. An additional $3 million from state and federal grants is required for completion to 18th Street; completion is scheduled for 2008.

Along with the streetscape project, a Judd Plaza renovation is also being planned. More green space, recreational and seating areas, and a stage are envisioned for the brick-lined plaza at the corner of 16th Street and Winchester Avenue. It would be home to concerts, speeches and plays and would tie into the Country Music Highway which runs through the city. In the immediate future, a clock at the plaza may be installed that would honor the city's recent sesquicentennial celebration.
