= Mayo Mansion (Ashland, Kentucky) =

Historic house in Kentucky, United States

- U.S. Historic district – Contributing property
- Location within Kentucky Location within the United States
- Location: 1516 Bath Avenue, Ashland, Kentucky
- Coordinates: 38°28′33″N 82°38′33″W
- Built: 1864; 1917: Significant expansion
- Architectural style: Beaux-Arts
- Part of: Bath Avenue Historic District
- Added to NRHP: July 3, 1979

Mayo Mansion, also known as Fetter Mansion, is a historic mansion located in the Bath Avenue Historic District in downtown Ashland, Kentucky.

== History ==
Following the death of her husband, John C. C. Mayo, Alice Jane Mayo moved to Florida. In 1916, she met Dr. Samuel P. Fetter of Portsmouth, Ohio, while he was recovering from an illness in Palm Beach, Florida. They married the following year and purchased the Victorian Gartrell-Hager House in Ashland, Kentucky, which was built in 1864. Although Mayo wanted to build a new house, she could not due to rations set in place during World War I. To avoid being arrested for building a new home, she received permission to remodel the existing house. Using the wealth amassed from the Mayo Companies, she rebuilt the entire building, transforming it into a 17,000 sq ft (1,579 m^{2}) Beaux-Arts mansion. Much of the interior, including the tile and marble was taken from her and her first husband's other home, also known as Mayo Mansion, in Paintsville, Kentucky.

A large pool house that was attached to the mansion was demolished in the 1950s. Mayo Mansion was occupied by the Highlands Museum and Discovery Center from 1984 until 1994, when the museum moved into the former C.H. Parsons Department Store Building in the Ashland Commercial Historic District.
