= Highlands Museum and Discovery Center =

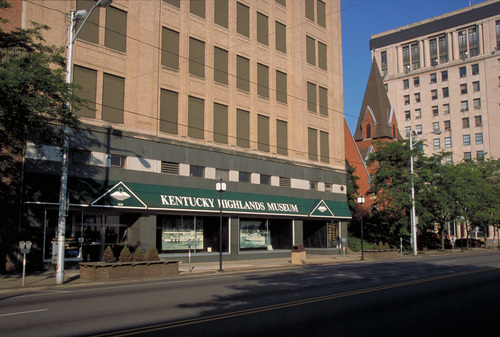

- Location within Kentucky Location within the United States
- Established: 1984
- Location: 1620 Winchester Avenue, Ashland, Kentucky 41101
- Coordinates: 38.47852°N 82.63930°W
- Type: Heritage center, Science center
- Director: Carol R. Allen
- Public transit access: Ashland Bus System
- Website: highlandsmuseum.com

The Highlands Museum and Discovery Center is a heritage center and science center located in Ashland, Kentucky, United States. The museum displays exhibits on local history and specialized science displays for children along with providing educational outreach programs.

== History ==
The Kentucky Highlands Museum and Discovery Center was established in 1984 in Ashland's historic Mayo Mansion as the Kentucky Highlands Museum. By 1994, additional space was needed and the museum was moved to the former C.H. Parsons Department Store Building in Ashland's Commercial Historic District. The museum was renamed the Highlands Museum and Discovery Center in 1997.

In 2003–2004, the museum began developing plans to renovate and expand spaces, with specific plans of implementing additional interactive exhibits which focus on the history of Ashland and the Eastern Mountain Coal Fields. Phase I of redevelopment began in November 2005 and was completed in January 2006. Phase II began in the fall of 2006 after Perry and Susan Madden, the owners of the Parsons Building, donated the structure to the Community & Technical College Foundation of Ashland. The donation required that the museum must remain a tenant in the Parsons Building and that it must join a partnership with Ashland Community and Technical College, allowing the college to use the building in its educational programs. However, in July 2013, the foundation, citing economic conditions and other factors, placed the building for sale. The museum finalized the purchase of the building in November 2013.

== See also ==
- List of museums in Huntington, West Virginia
