= C. H. Parsons Co. =

Former American department store chain

The C.H. Parsons Company was a regional department store chain headquartered in Ashland, Kentucky. Touted as "Eastern Kentucky's finest store", it served the entire eastern portion of the state from its large five-story "flagship" location on U.S. Routes 23 and 60, major regional arteries, in downtown Ashland. It was also known locally for its lavish seasonal window displays on the ground floor of the store.

Parsons operated a smaller second location in Morehead, Kentucky, for many years. In the early 1970s, Parson's continued with long-time growth when it acquired an adjacent storefront, which had previously been the Capital Theater, and reopened it as Parson's Men Store. On the left side of the men's store was Parson's Furniture, which is still in operation today under different ownership, many years after its parent company's demise. When a seven-story parking garage was built on the back side of the city block in 1976, a "catwalk" was built connecting the Parson's store to the parking structure for the convenience of its customers who got free parking vouchers with any purchase. Parson's carried only the latest fashions for men, women, and children of all ages, along with shoes, toys, fur coats, and premium household furnishings.

In 1994, the building became the Kentucky Highlands Museum. Parsons Furniture has started mailing notices to customers that its furniture store will be closing. As of late 2013, the store is no longer open for business.

== See also ==
- Highlands Museum and Discovery Center
