= Poage Landing Days =

Annual festival in Kentucky, USA

- Genre: Festival
- Date: 3-days on 3rd weekend of September
- Frequency: Annual
- Locations: Ashland, Kentucky, United States
- Years active: 1990–present (1990; 36 years ago)
- Attendance: 20,000-30,000
- Website: Poage Landing Days

Poage Landing Days is an annual festival held in Ashland, Kentucky celebrating the city's heritage and founding as Poage's Landing by the Poage family in 1786. The festival is a 3-day event that takes place on the third weekend of September.

== History ==
The modern Poage Landing Days festival was founded in 1990, after being proposed by city officials as a way to honor the founding family's legacy and to foster civic pride and cultural tourism. Poage Landing Days continues to be recognized as one of Kentucky's leading community events. It has been named a "Top 25 Downtown Festival" by the Kentucky Main Street Program.

In 2024, Poage Landing Days was temporarily relocated from its traditional setting along Winchester Avenue in downtown Ashland due to ongoing construction. Central Park was chosen as the new location and under the branding Poage in the Park. It returned to its traditional name and location in 2025.

== Activities ==
The festival features a variety of family-friendly activities including live music, food and drink vendors, arts and crafts, and amusement rides. The live music typically showcases local and regional bands.

For 20 years, the festival has featured The Southern Fried Cone Contest, a skateboarding contest and race. It is one of the nation's longest-running skateboarding slalom contests.

The Poage Family Reunion is also put on by the festival. Descendants of the original Poage family hold their family reunion. A Poage Family Tree Chart is put on display.

On Sunday morning, a community church service takes place that is open to the public.
