= Camayo Arcade =

- U.S. Historic district – Contributing property
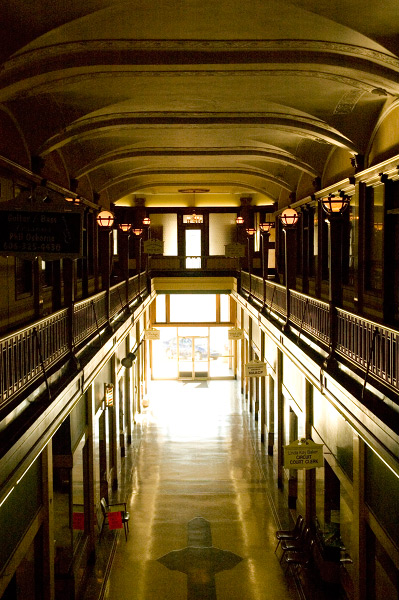
- The Camayo Arcade prior to renovations

- Location within Kentucky Location within the United States
- Location: 1530 Winchester Avenue, Ashland, Kentucky
- Coordinates: 38°28′43.6″N 82°38′25″W
- Built: 1925-26
- Part of: Ashland Commercial Historic District
- Added to NRHP: July 8, 1994

The Camayo Arcade is a historic shopping arcade located along Winchester Avenue in downtown Ashland, Kentucky. It opened in July 1926 and was the first indoor shopping mall built in the state of Kentucky. The building is part of the Ashland Commercial Historic District.

== History ==
On September 22, 1925, a construction contract was awarded to C. Harrison Smith, a general contractor from Huntington, West Virginia. Demolition of the Josselson Brothers Furniture Store began the following week on the site where the arcade would be constructed. By this time, 60% of the retail space on the second and third floors of the building had been leased. The storefronts were constructed out of rosetta marble and each interior store featured a depth of 17.5 feet, with a width of 15, 30 or 45 feet, with or without partitions. Electrical fixtures were installed beginning in June 1925 by the Beardslee Chandelier Manufacturing Company of Chicago. The arcade opened under the management of John C. C. Mayo Jr. and Alexander Cameron in July 1926.

On October 9, 1926, the 15,000 sq ft (1,394 m^{2}) Camayo Arcade Recreation Center opened in basement of the building. The recreation center featured billiards tables and a bowling alley. Once completed, the Camayo Arcade had 68,190 sq ft (6,335 m^{2}) of total floor space.

The building underwent significant renovations in 2012 after being purchased by resident Perry Madden.

== See also ==
- Arcade (architecture)
- Ashland Commercial Historic District
- Cityscape of Ashland, Kentucky
- Retail
- Shopping Arcade
