= Culbertson House =

Historic house in Kentucky, United States

- U.S. National Register of Historic Places
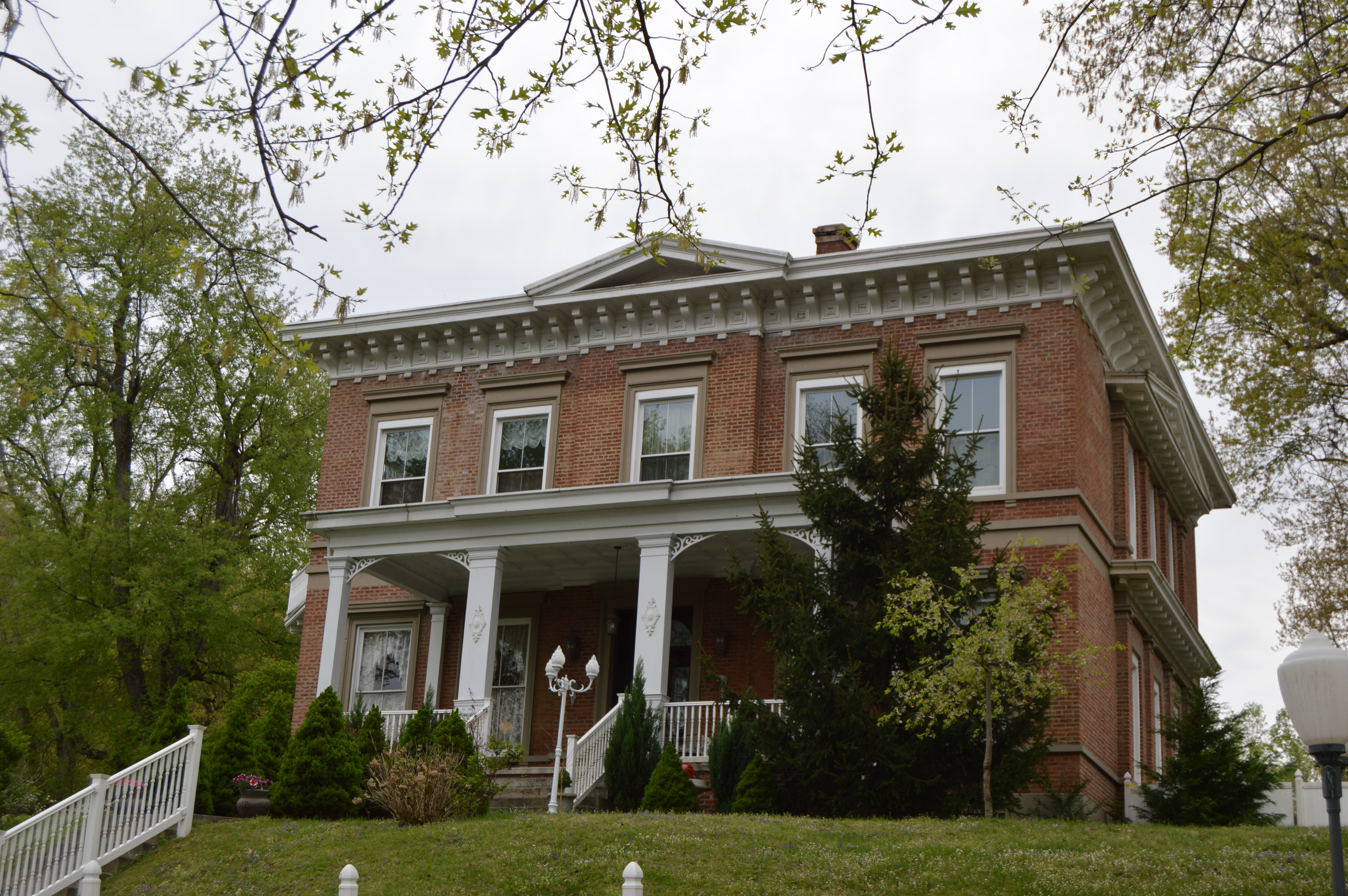
- House in 2014

- Location within Kentucky Location within the United States
- Location: 1520 Chestnut Dr., Ashland, Kentucky
- Coordinates: 38°28′26″N 82°38′42″W
- Area: 0 acres (0 ha)
- Built: 1876
- Architectural style: Italianate
- MPS: Ashland MRA
- NRHP reference No.: 79003560
- Added to NRHP: July 3, 1979

The Culbertson House in Ashland, Kentucky is an Italianate-style house built in 1876. It is located at 1520 Chestnut Dr. It was listed on the National Register of Historic Places in 1979.

It was built by iron industrialist Thomas Means for his daughter. It is larger than most houses of its era in the area, has "is encrusted with an unusually profuse variety of Italianate features."
