= WTSF =

Television station in Ashland, Kentucky

- Ashland, Kentucky; Huntington–Charleston, West Virginia; United States
- City: Ashland, Kentucky
- Channels: Digital: 13 (VHF); Virtual: 61

Programming
- Affiliations: 61.1: Daystar; 61.2: Daystar Español; 61.3: Daystar Reflections

Ownership
- Owner: Daystar Television Network; (Word of God Fellowship, Inc.)

History
- First air date: April 30, 1983
- Former channel numbers: Analog: 61 (UHF, 1983–2009); Digital: 44 (UHF, until 2020); Virtual: 44 (2009–2019)
- Former affiliations: Commercial Ind. (1982–1983); Religious Ind. (1983–2003)
- Call sign meaning: Tri-State Family Broadcasting

Technical information
- Licensing authority: FCC
- Facility ID: 67798
- ERP: 8 kW
- HAAT: 174.1 m (571 ft)
- Transmitter coordinates: 38°25′11″N 82°24′6″W

Links
- Public license information: Public file; LMS
- Website: www.daystar.com

WTSF (channel 61) is a religious television station licensed to Ashland, Kentucky, United States, serving the Huntington–Charleston, West Virginia market. The station is owned by the Daystar Television Network. WTSF's studios are located in the former Coles Junior High School building on Bath Avenue in Ashland, and its transmitter is located on a very short tower in Huntington's Rotary Park.

== History ==
WTSF signed on as a commercial independent television station in September 1982. However, it was not successful and was soon donated to a local religious group, later broadcasting out of the former Coles Junior High School building, which has housed the station ever since. It continued as such until 2003 when the station was sold to the Daystar national charismatic Christian network and, with a few exceptions, ended local programming.

While it was locally produced, the bulk of the channel's programming consisted of fundraising to continue broadcasting.

== Technical information ==
=== Subchannels ===
The station's signal is multiplexed:

Subchannels of WTSF
Subchannel	Res.	Short name	Programming
61.1	1080i	WTSF-HD	Daystar
61.2	720p	WTSF-ES	Daystar Español
61.3	480i	WTSF-SD	Daystar Reflections

=== Analog-to-digital conversion ===
WTSF shut down its analog signal, over UHF channel 61, on June 12, 2009, the official date on which full-power television stations in the United States transitioned from analog to digital broadcasts under federal mandate. The station's digital signal remained on its pre-transition UHF channel 44, using virtual channel 61.
