= Bath Avenue Historic District =

Historic district in Kentucky, United States

- U.S. National Register of Historic Places
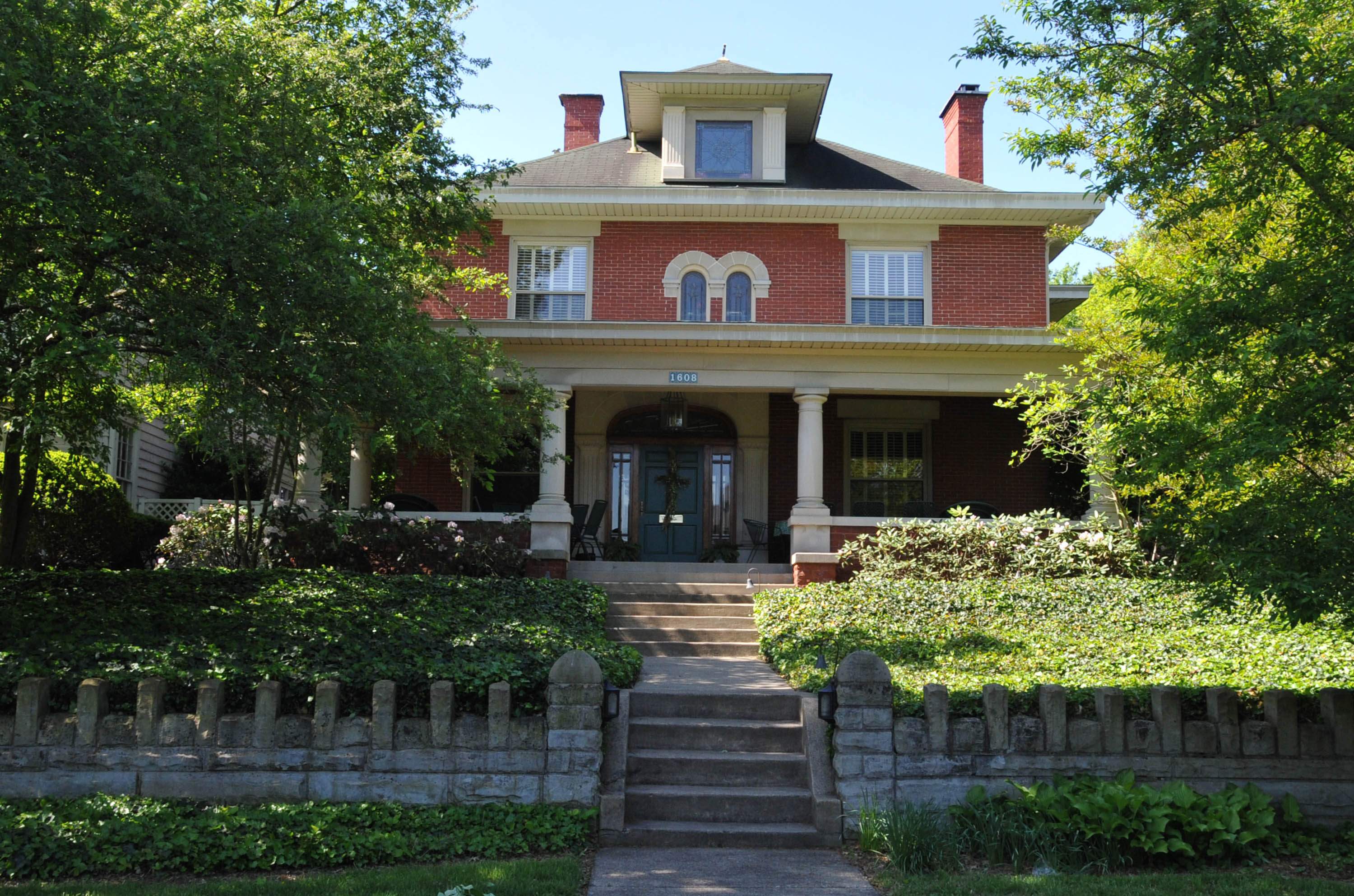

- Location within Kentucky Location within the United States
- Location: Bath Ave. from 13th to 17th Sts., Ashland, Kentucky
- Coordinates: 38°28′35″N 82°38′35″W
- Area: 15 acres (6.1 ha)
- Built: 1856
- Architectural style: Late 19th And 20th Century Revivals, Late Victorian
- MPS: Ashland MRA
- NRHP reference No.: 79003552
- Added to NRHP: July 3, 1979

The Bath Avenue Historic District, in Ashland, Kentucky, is a 15 acres (6.1 ha) historic district which was listed on the National Register of Historic Places in 1979. It included 26 contributing buildings and two contributing objects.

It is a four-block section of Bath Avenue, running from 13th to 17th Streets, out of a six-block stretch which "has been considered to be the city's most prestigious residential neighborhood."

== See also ==
- Mayo Mansion (Ashland, Kentucky): a contributing property
