= First Presbyterian Church (Ashland, Kentucky) =

Historic church in Kentucky, United States

- U.S. National Register of Historic Places
- U.S. Historic district – Contributing property
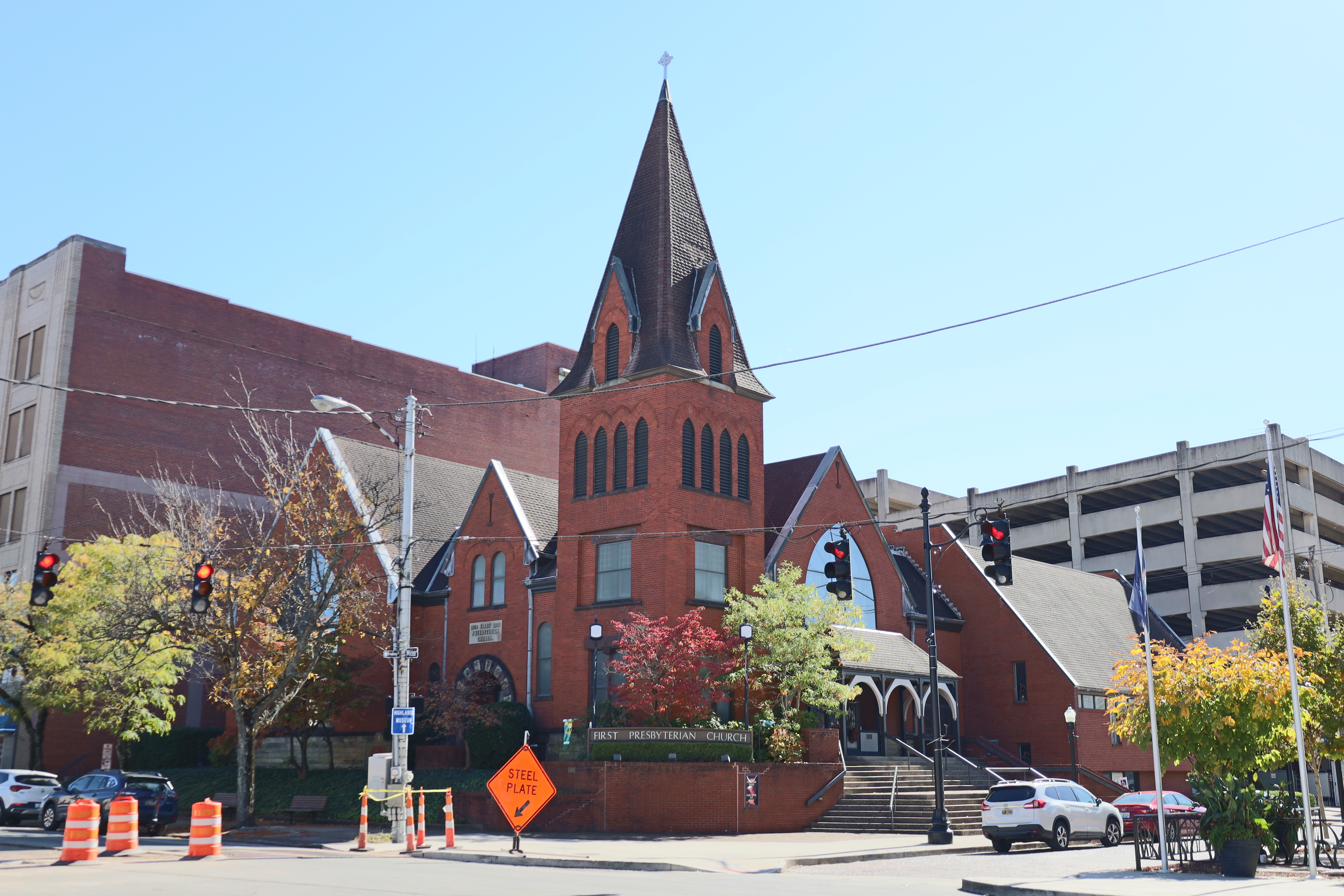
- The church in 2023

- Location within Kentucky Location within the United States
- Location: 1600 Winchester Ave., Ashland, Kentucky
- Coordinates: 38°28′41″N 82°38′23″W
- Area: 9.9 acres (4.0 ha)
- Built: 1857-58
- Architectural style: Late Victorian
- Part of: Ashland Commercial Historic District (ID94000838)
- MPS: Ashland MRA (AD)
- NRHP reference No.: 73000787

Significant dates
- Added to NRHP: June 19, 1973
- Designated CP: August 5, 1994

The First Presbyterian Church in Ashland, Kentucky is a historic church building at 1600 Winchester Avenue. It has also been known as Bethesda Church. It was built in 1858 and added to the National Register of Historic Places in 1973.

It was then the oldest structure still being used for a church in Boyd County. It is a red brick building with a bell tower and stained glass windows.

The building was the third of the congregation; its first was a log building used from 1819 to 1928.

== See also ==
- National Register of Historic Places listings in Kentucky

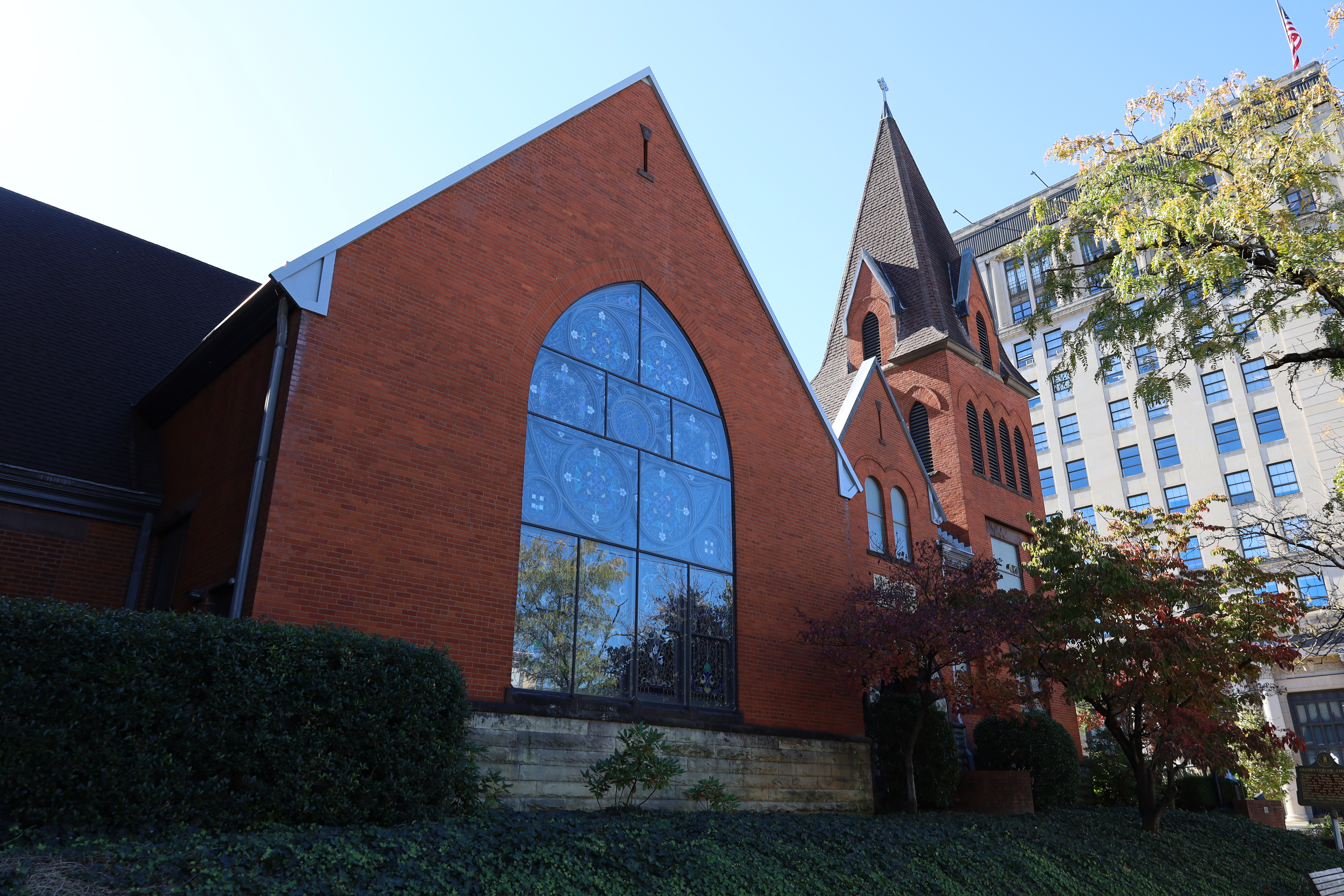
The church in 2023
