= Nando Felty Saloon =

Historic building in Ashland, Kentucky

- U.S. National Register of Historic Places
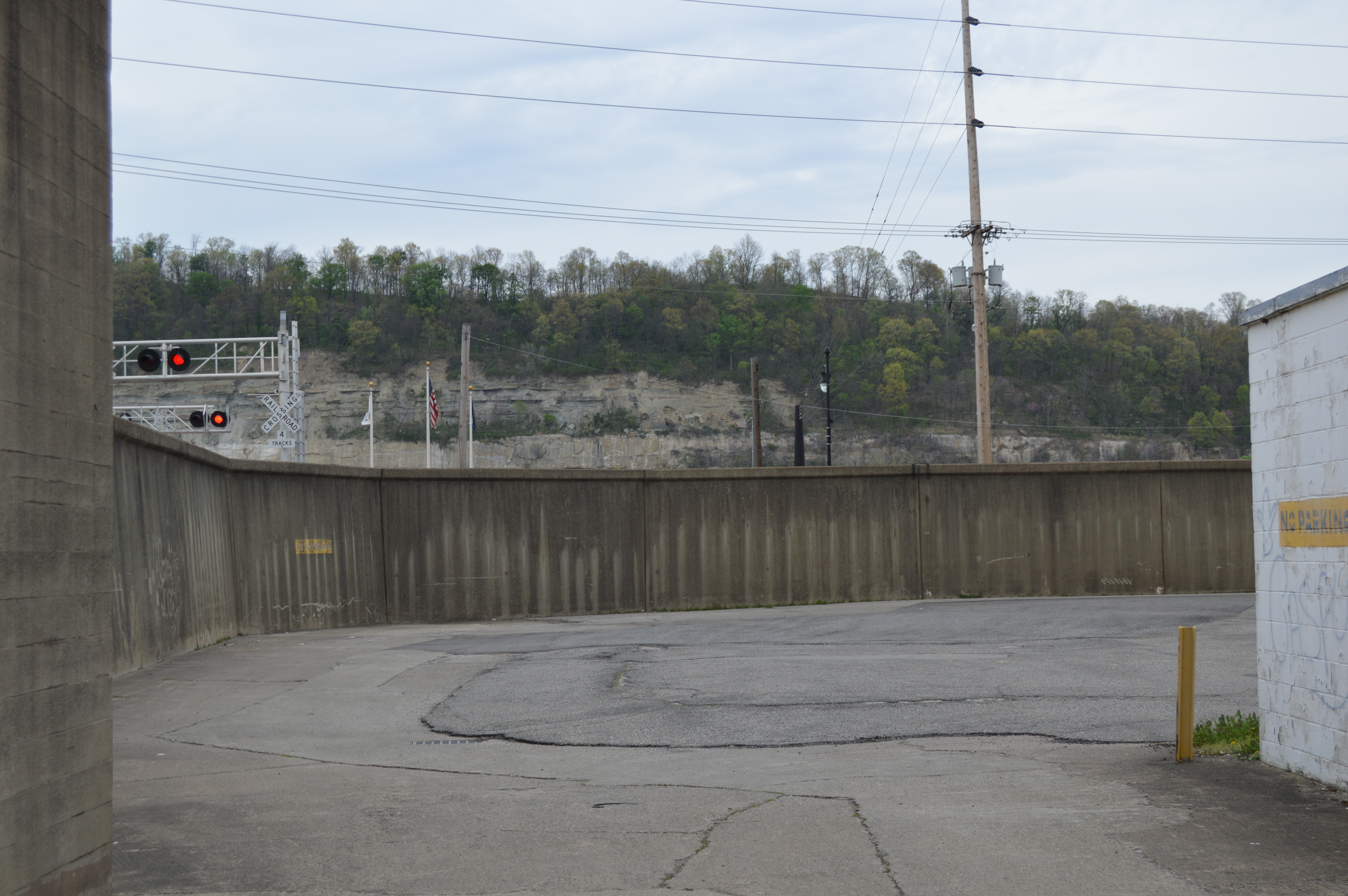
- Former site of the saloon. Levee wall protecting vs. flooding of the Ohio River at rear.

- Location within Kentucky Location within the United States
- Location: 1500 Front St., Ashland, Kentucky
- Coordinates: 38°28′51″N 82°38′21″W
- Built: 1895
- MPS: Ashland MRA
- NRHP reference No.: 79003557
- Added to NRHP: July 3, 1979

The Nando Felty Saloon, at 1500 Front St. in Ashland, Kentucky, was built in 1895. It was listed on the National Register of Historic Places in 1979.

It was a three-story three-bay brick commercial building, overlooking the Ohio River and railroad tracks. Its first-floor windows were filled with brickwork later, but the facade had surviving cast-iron pilasters with "serpentine relief", a motif "formerly also found on the facade of the City Market building on Greenup Avenue, demolished in 1978." The facades also had pressed metal Italianate-style cornices and window hoods. The building's southwest wall was painted with "several fine early commercial graphics, including 'LET US BE YOUR TAILORS; THE UNITED WOOLEN MILLS CO; TAILORS TO THE MASSES.'"

The building served as a saloon and a boarding house. It was significant as "a prominent Ashland social center until Prohibition. Barry and Johnson, John Cobs, and Nando Felty were successive owners of a saloon here. This is one of the most substantial nineteenth-century commercial buildings in Ashland, and is the only surviving early hostel building."
