= Ohio Valley in Kentucky =

Valley in Kentucky, United States of America

Coordinates: 38°20′N 85°30′W

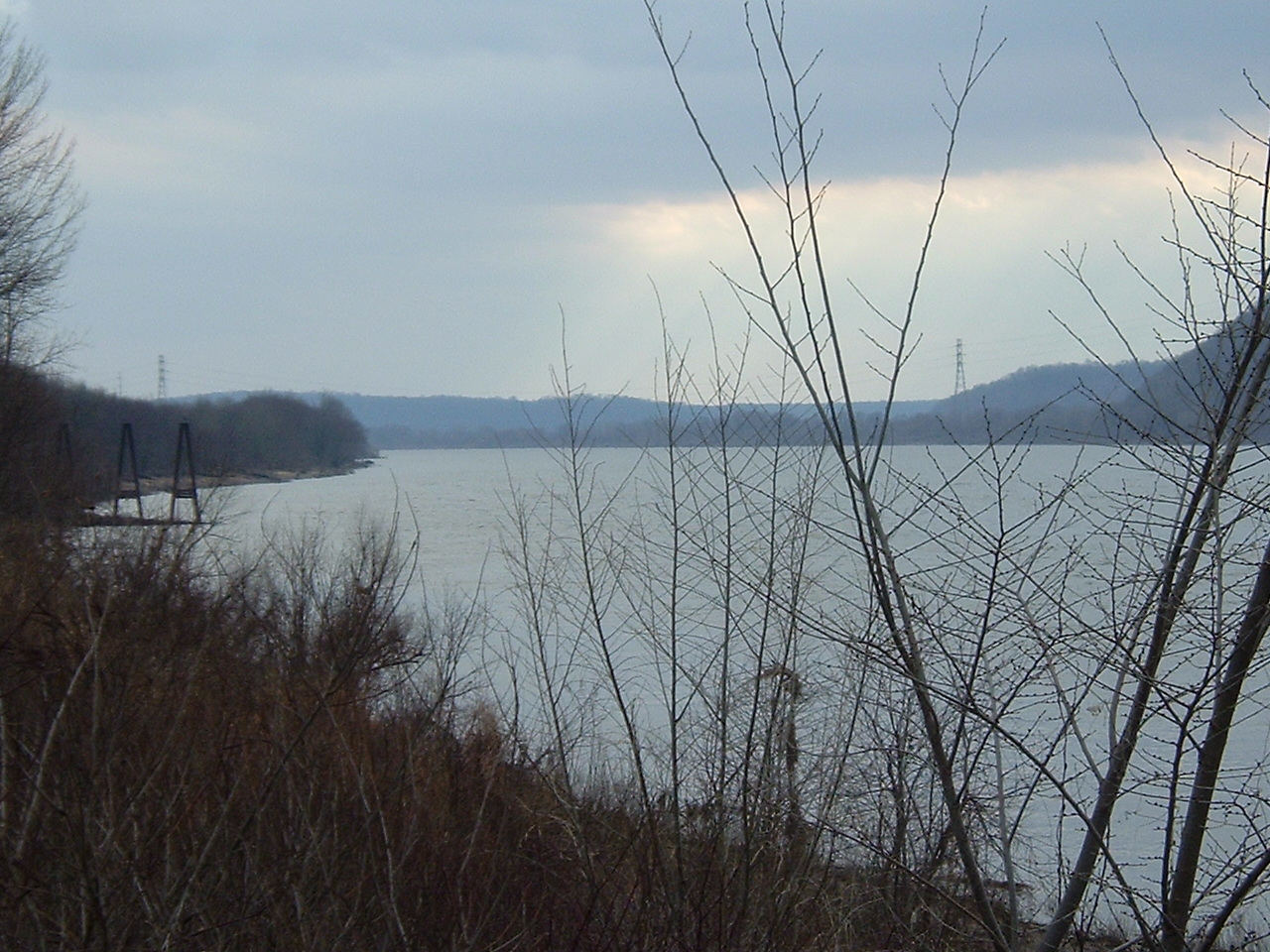
The Ohio River in southwest Louisville looking towards West Point, KY

The Ohio Valley is a sub region in Kentucky running 658 miles (1,059 km) long including parts of 25 counties and across five regions of the state. Over 45% of Kentucky's population live in counties that border the Ohio River, although those counties are only 16% of the state's land area.

The Ohio Valley in Kentucky can be broken up into several categories:

== The Ohio Valley in Eastern and Northern Kentucky ==
The physical characteristics of the Ohio River valley slightly changes from its beginning in downtown Pittsburgh, Pennsylvania towards northeast of Louisville, including the section that flows through a small part of the Cumberland Plateau and the Eden Shale hill region of Northern Kentucky. Throughout that entire stretch the river is contained in a very narrow valley bounded by hills that are from 100 to 400 feet (120 m) tall and have an average angle of 45 degrees. The river ranges in width in this stretch from around 1/4 of a mile to over 4/10 of a mile.

== The Ohio Valley in the Louisville Area ==
The Ohio Valley changes dramatically around Louisville, for the first time heading downstream there are no bluffs overlooking the river. The river itself gets much wider and shallower, from 4/10 of a mile wide to over 9/10 a mile wide at the canal entrance, then narrows to less than 3/10 of a mile downstream of the falls as it approaches the Falls of the Ohio, the only natural obstacle along the entire river. The falls were created by very hard coral rock, which the river hasn't been able to erode. The coral contains many visible fossils.

The flood plain through this stretch is very wide and flat, extending 10 miles (16 km) out on the Kentucky side and four miles (6 km) on the Indiana side, both east of the Muldraugh Escarpment. Also known as Muldraugh Hill, it divides the Bluegrass and Pennyroyal Plateau Regions in Kentucky, and the "karst plateau" in Indiana. The 400 feet (120 m) tall hill can be very visible in most parts of Louisville and provides a scenic backdrop for the city.

== From Muldraugh Hill to Owensboro ==
At West Point, Kentucky the river crosses the Muldraugh escarpment and is now bounded on both sides by the largest bluffs along its entire length. The bluffs here range from 400 to 500 feet and in many places are almost vertical, although the flood plain is about twice as wide as in Northern Kentucky. The river here averages around 4/10 of a mile wide.

== From Owensboro to the Mississippi River ==
Starting near Rockport, Indiana the bluffs above the river reduce greatly to 60 feet (18 m) or less as the river enters a much flatter region. The river itself becomes much more like the Mississippi River in character, widening from around 1/2 a mile wide in the West Point stretch to over 8/10 of a mile, and with many more islands and oxbow lakes. This stretch of the river has 35 islands. Many of the oxbow lakes in this stretch have been made into wildlife management areas mostly for waterfowl, including the Ballard WMA which is the state's largest.
