= Paramount Arts Center =

- Paramount Theatre
- U.S. National Register of Historic Places
- U.S. Historic district – Contributing property
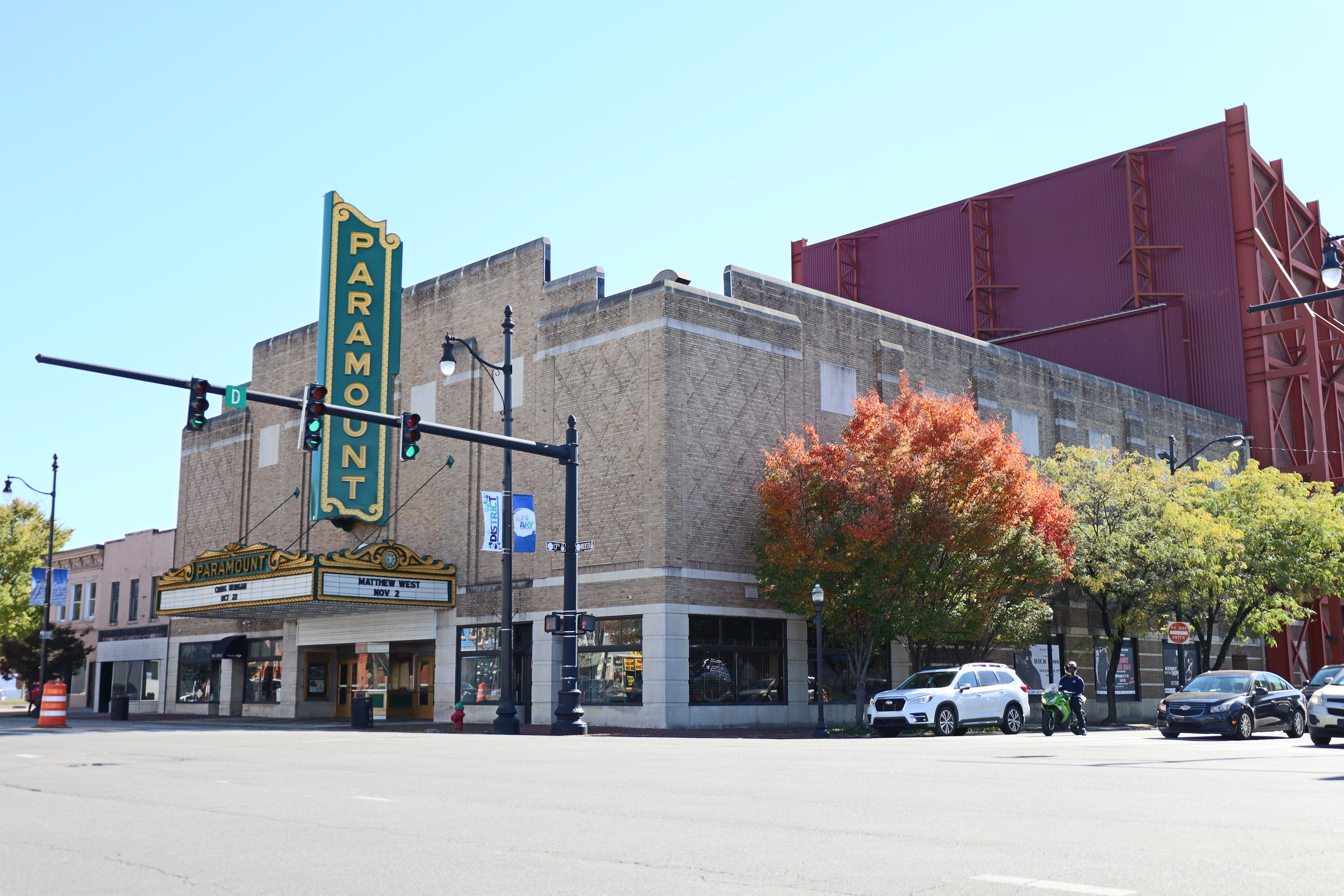
- The building in 2023
- Location: Ashland, Kentucky
- Coordinates: 38°28′47″N 82°38′34″W
- Built: 1931
- Architect: Rapp and Rapp
- Architectural style: Art Deco
- Part of: Ashland Commercial Historic District (ID94000838)
- NRHP reference No.: 75000736

Significant dates
- Added to NRHP: June 30, 1975
- Designated CP: August 5, 1994

The Paramount Arts Center is an historic theater located in Ashland, Kentucky, in the United States. Listed as the Paramount Theatre on the National Register of Historic Places, it operates as a non-profit organization, offering symphonies, Broadway plays, ballets, concerts, and other productions.

== History ==
=== Early history ===
The Paramount opened September 5, 1931 as the Paramount Theater, one of the first transitional theatres built for "talking pictures". It was to be a model for others across the country to showcase films produced by Paramount until the Great Depression led the studio to drop the project. The plans were picked up by an Ashland-based company, with Paramount craftsmen providing interior furnishings, and the building was leased to Paramount Publix Corporation. Due to the change in plans, the original design by Rapp and Rapp was scaled back; otherwise, the Paramount would be three times its present size.

=== Closure and reopening ===
The theater closed in 1971 after forty years of operation. In 1972, the Greater Ashland Foundation purchased the Paramount Theatre and established it as a performing arts center. In 1992, the music video for "Achy Breaky Heart" by Billy Ray Cyrus was filmed at the Paramount.

The theater has undergone multiple renovations since 1972, most recently in 2002 when a new stagehouse was added, and new dressing rooms, rehearsal space and a banquet facility were added in a nearby building, purchased in 1998, which was then connected to the main building.

In 2006, a beauty pageant contestant hung a dress from a water sprinkler while using a steamer to remove wrinkles. Water from the sprinkler system resulted in $30,000 worth of damage.1

== Haunting ==
It is said that during early work on the Paramount, a death occurred, and the man's ghost has since haunted the venue. According to lore, in the early 1940s, four construction workers from Cincinnati were at work in the auditorium. All but one went to lunch. When the others returned, they found their co-worker hanging from the curtain rigging. Since that time, sounds have allegedly been heard, items have gone missing, unexplained cold drafts have been felt, and the image of a man has been seen. Despite this, most versions of the story refer to "Joe" as a "good ghost" who looks out for the theatre and its occupants.

When Billy Ray Cyrus was at the Paramount for the "Achy Breaky Heart" video, he was told about the ghost. It is customary for each performer who appears at the Paramount to sign an 8x10, which hangs on the 'Wall of Fame' in the box office. Cyrus autographed posters to the female employees, plus one with a personal inscription to Paramount Joe. As time passed and the walls became full of 8x10's of other performers, some had to come down. No one wanted to take down their personally autographed picture of Billy Ray Cyrus, so they took down the one for Paramount Joe. The next day, the story has it that every 8x10 and poster that had been hanging neatly on the walls the night before were strewn on the floor, many with their frames shattered. Paramount Joe's poster still hangs in the Paramount, in The Marquee Room, site of Paramount Joe's Rising Star Café.

In 2004, marketing director Tyson Compton gave a tour to some high school students. While relating the Paramount Joe story, he stopped and called out, "Joe, are you here? Is it okay that I tell your story?" He said he then heard a seat squeak, and received a call the next day from a local psychic. She asked if someone close to him had died recently, because she received a message from "the other side," which was: "I'm supposed to tell you that Joe said he is here."

== The Paramount Players ==
The Paramount Players are a group of local actors who perform in straight plays and musicals. The Paramount Players have won the Kentucky Theatre Association Outstanding Production Award, IMEA Award for Best Musical, Best Director, and Best Choreography.
