= Ashland Commercial Historic District =

Historic district in Kentucky, United States

- U.S. National Register of Historic Places
- U.S. Historic district
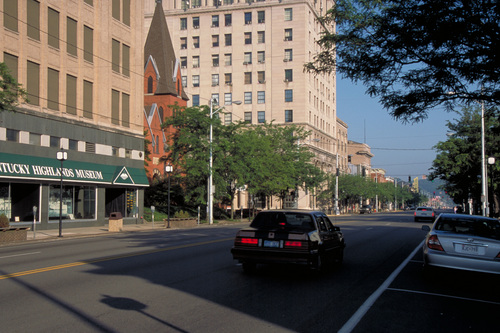
- Southern side of the 1600 block of Winchester Avenue

- Location within Kentucky Location within the United States
- Location: Ashland, Kentucky, United States
- Coordinates: 38°28′45″N 82°38′24″W
- Area: 21 acres (8.5 ha)
- Architectural style: Commercial style
- NRHP reference No.: 94000838
- Added to NRHP: August 5, 1994

The Ashland Commercial Historic District is a designated historic district bounded by 13th Street, Carter Avenue, 18th Street, and Front Street in Downtown Ashland, Kentucky. It is composed of 84 properties, including such prominent buildings as the Camayo Arcade, Crump and Field Grocery Company, First Presbyterian Church, Paramount Arts Center, and Ashland National Bank Building.

The 21 acres (8.5 ha) district covers nearly 13 blocks, with the period of significance being 1850 to 1940. The brick commercial buildings within the district date from 1890 to 1940, although 43 of the buildings date from 1900 to 1925; a period of significant economic expansion for Ashland.

== Gallery ==
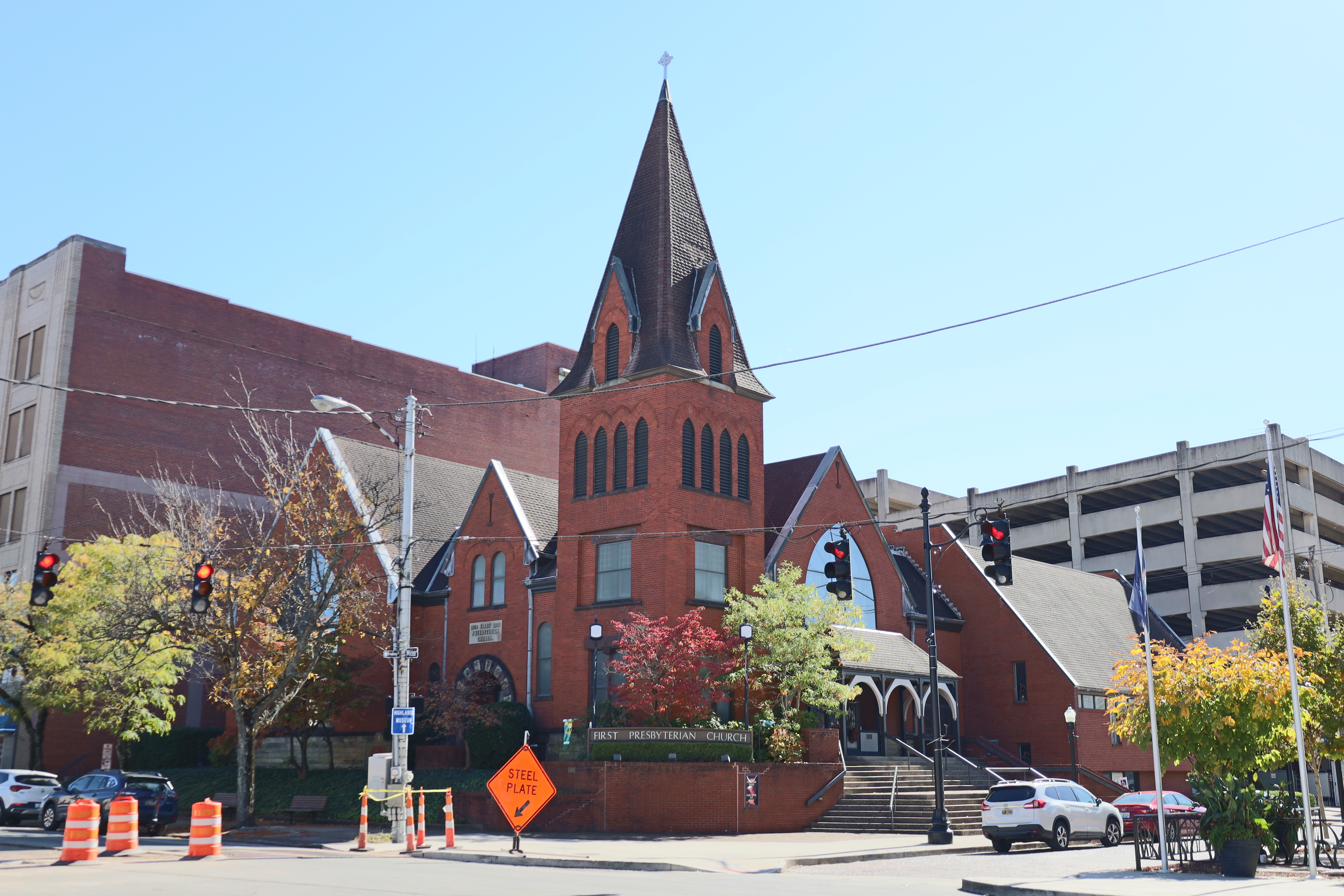
First Presbyterian Church

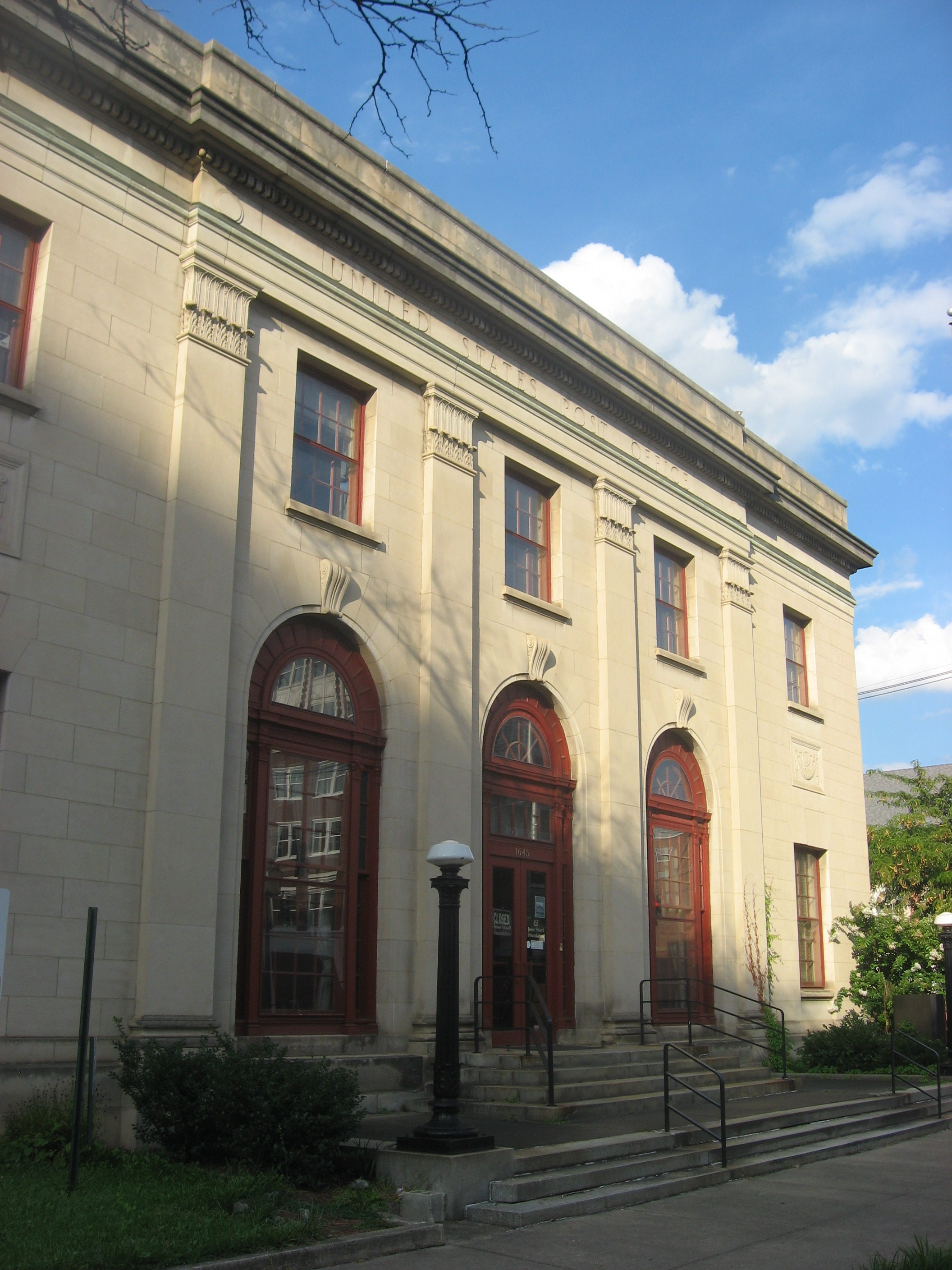
Former Post Office

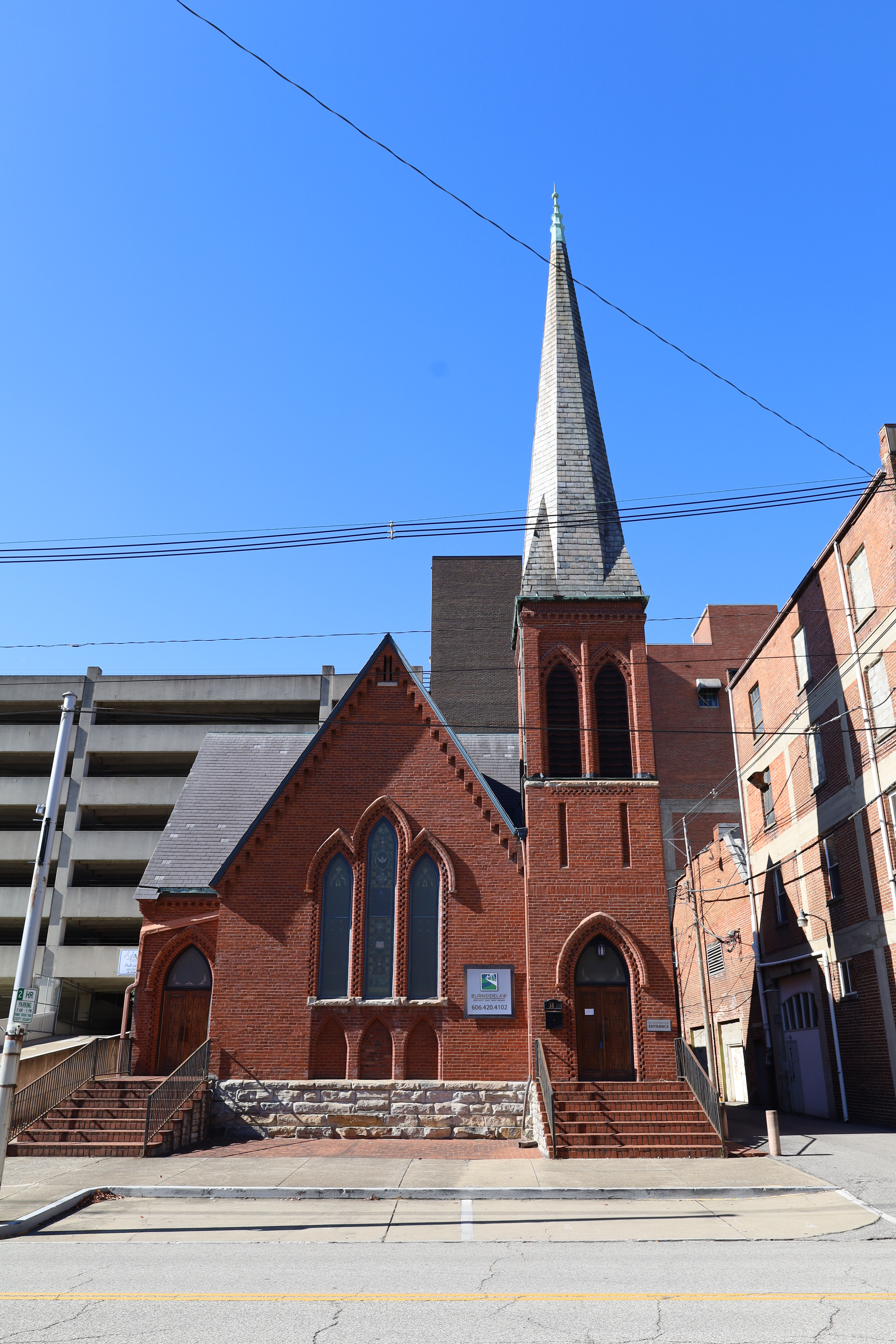
First Christian Church

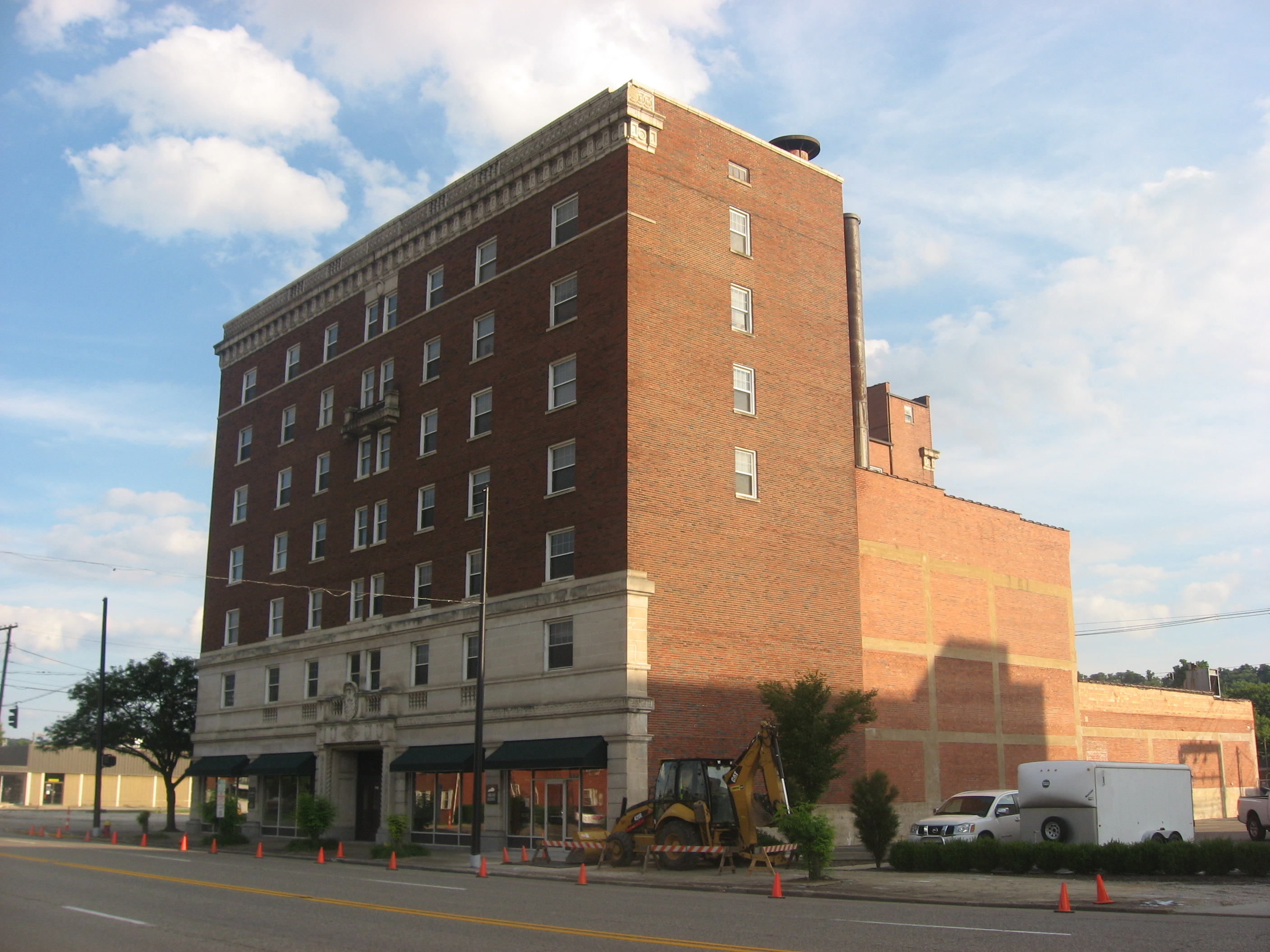
Henry Clay Hotel

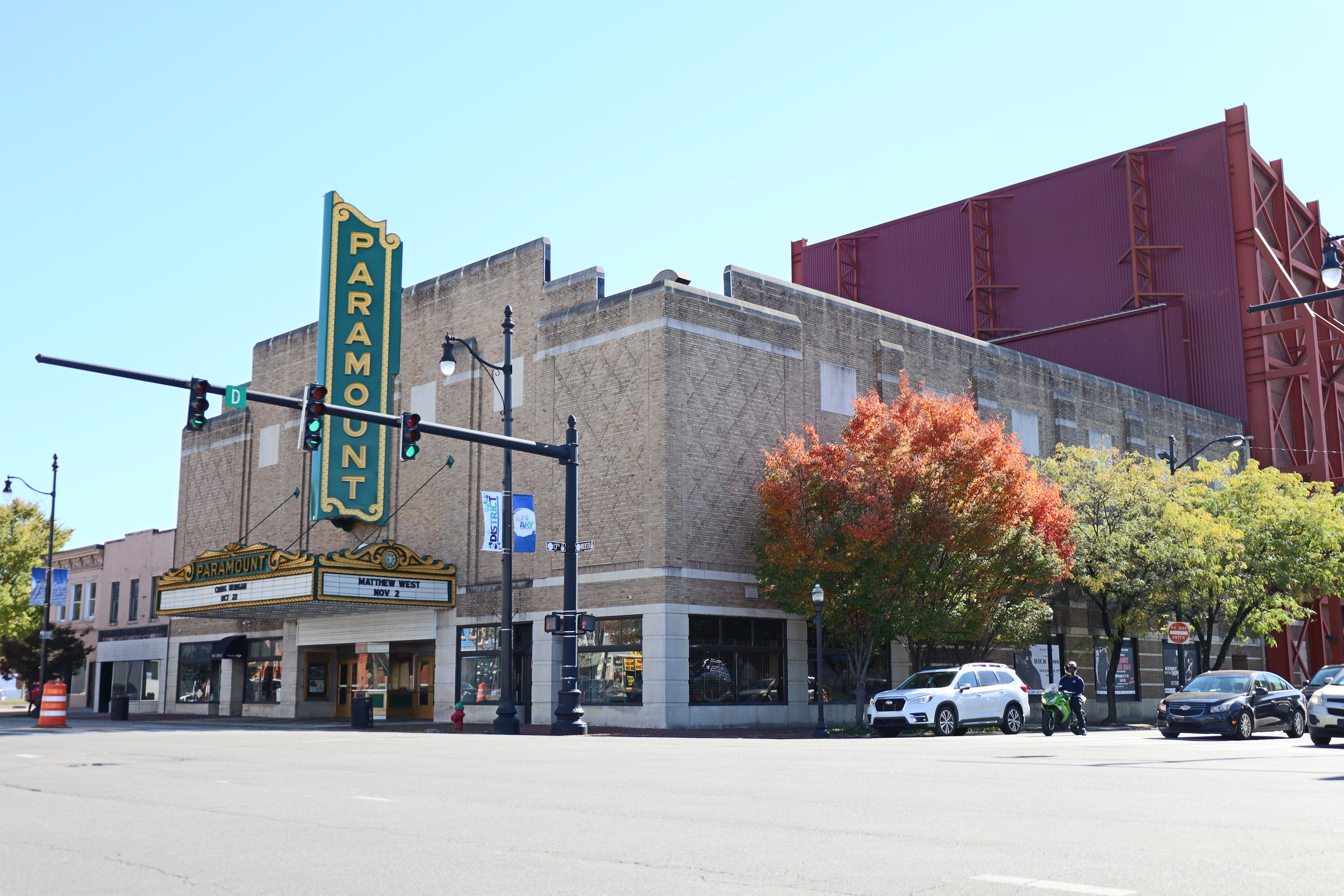
Paramount Arts Center

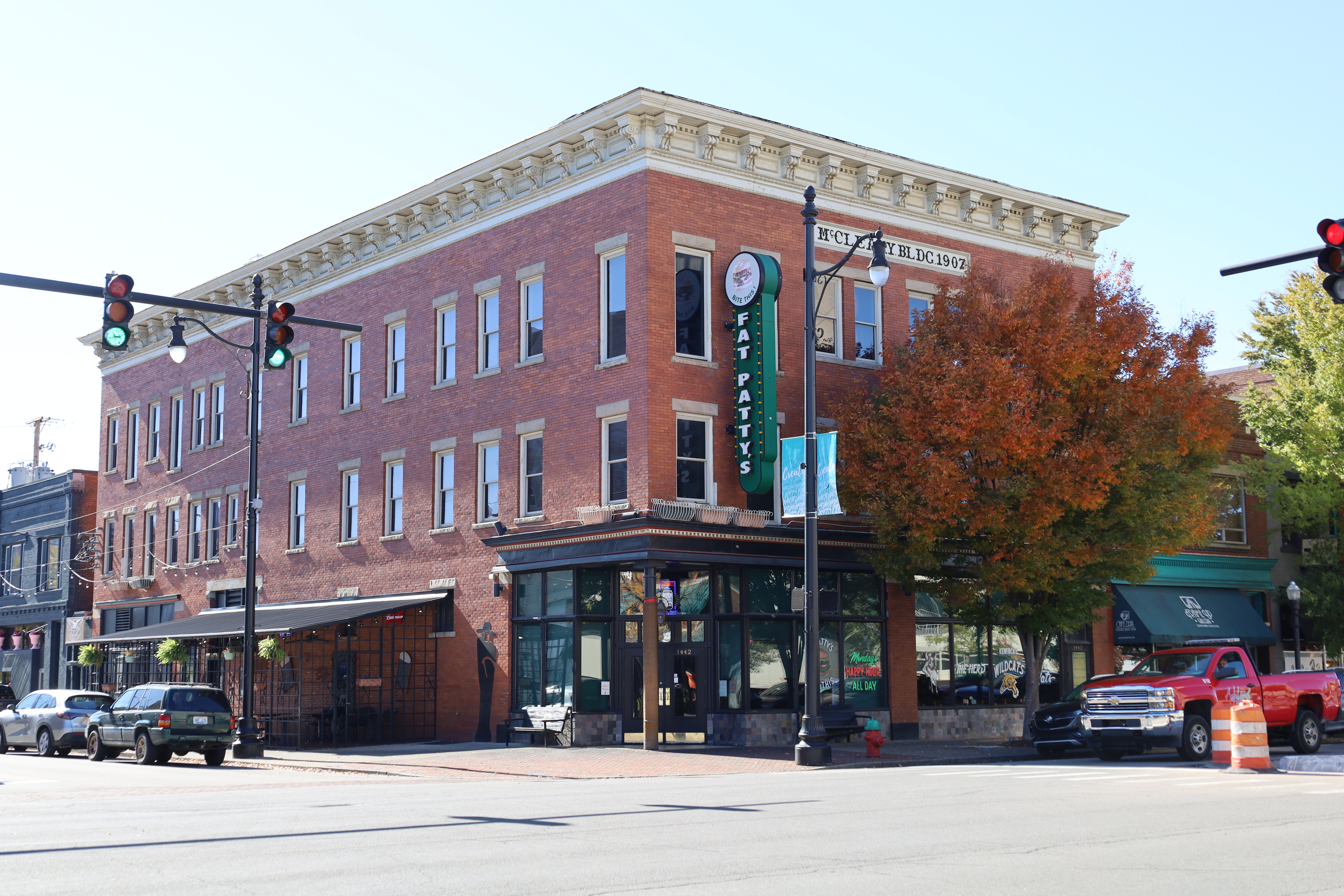
McCleary Building

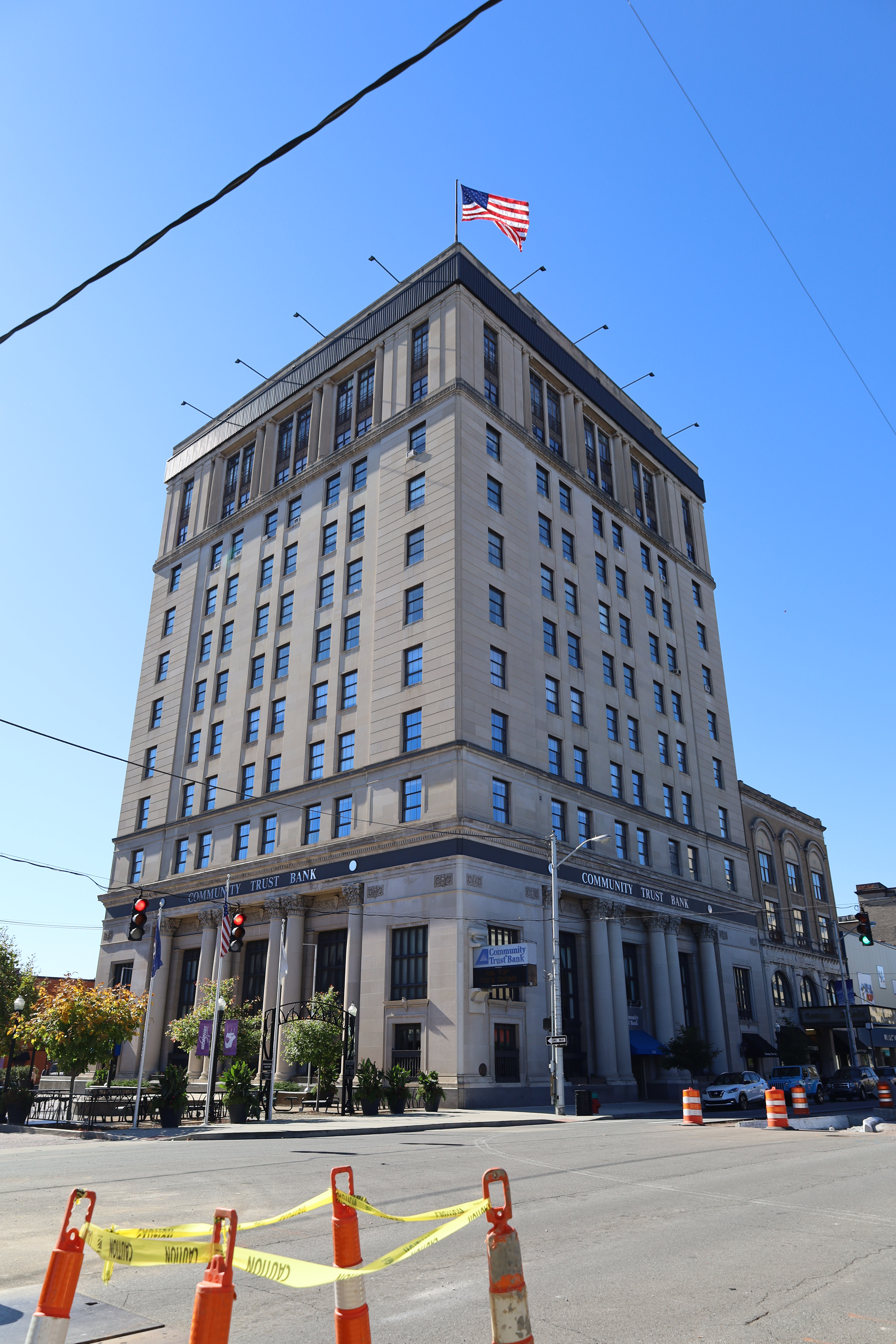
Ashland National Bank Building

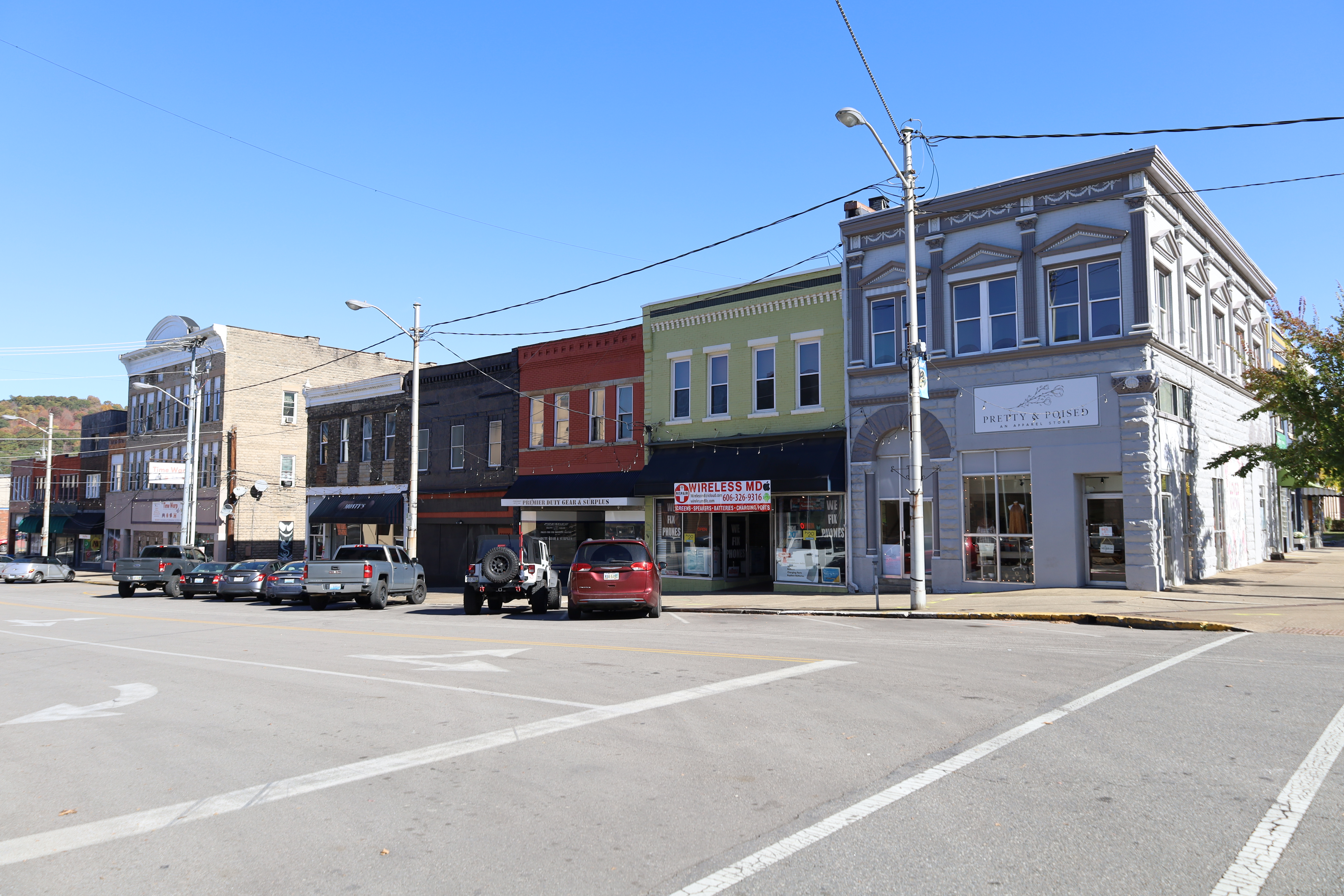
Buildings along 16th Street
