= Joseph Bosworth =

Joseph Bosworth may refer to:

- Joseph Bosworth (scholar) (1788–1876), English scholar of the Anglo-Saxon language
- Joseph Bosworth (politician) (1866–1941), American lawyer, businessman, and politician in Kentucky
