= Kentucky Wesleyan College =

Methodist college in Owensboro, Kentucky, US

- Motto: Find Yourself
- Type: Private college
- Established: 1858; 168 years ago
- Religious affiliation: United Methodist Church
- Academic affiliations: IAMSCU; CIC
- Endowment: $38.1 million (2024)
- President: Thomas Mitzel
- Students: 785
- Location: Owensboro, Kentucky, U.S. 37.7435°N 87.1202°W
- Campus: Suburban, 55 acres (22 ha)
- Colors: Purple and white
- Sporting affiliations: NCAA Division II; G-MAC
- Mascot: Panthers
- Website: kwc.edu

Kentucky Wesleyan College (KWC) is a private Methodist college in Owensboro, Kentucky, United States. Fall 2018 enrollment was 830 students.

== History ==
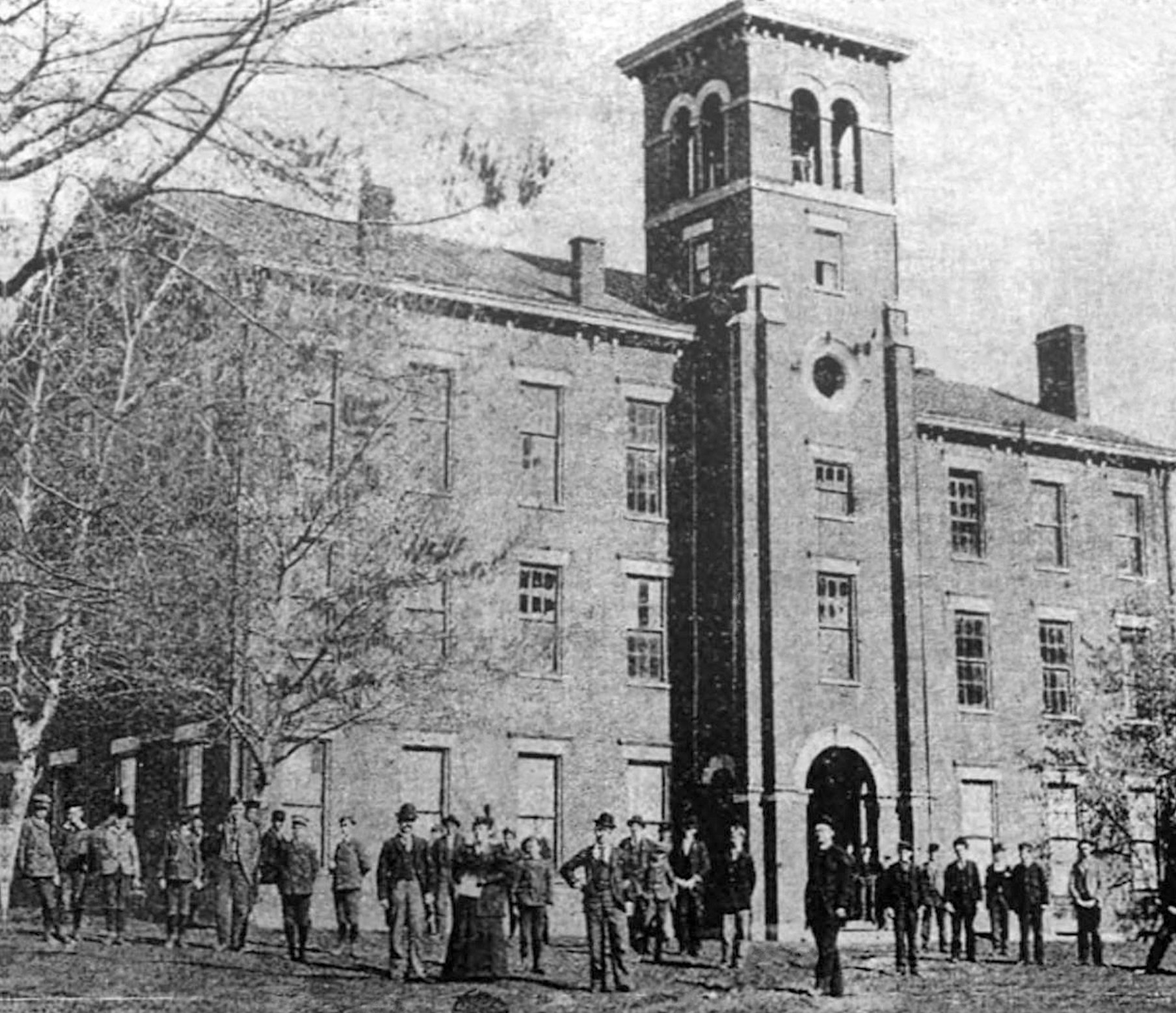
Kentucky Wesleyan College in Millersburg, active from 1858 to 1890

Kentucky Wesleyan College was founded in 1858 by the Kentucky Conference of the Methodist Episcopal Church. It was originally located in rural Millersburg, Kentucky. Classes began in 1866 and the first commencement took place in 1868. At first, it was a training school for preachers, but soon business and liberal arts classes were added to the curriculum.

In 1890, the school was moved to Winchester and soon after, women began to be admitted for the first time. In 1951, Lawrence W. Hager raised over US$1,000,000 to move the school to its present location in Kentucky's fourth largest city, Owensboro.

=== Presidents ===
College presidents include:

1. Charles Taylor (1866–1870)
Interim A.G. Murphy (1869–1870)
2. Benjamin Arbogast (1870–1873)
3. John Darby (1873–1875)
4. Thomas J. Dodd (1875–1876)
5. William H. Anderson (1876–1879)
6. David W. Batson (1879–1883)
7. Alexander Redd (1883–1884)
8. David W. Batson (1884–1893)
9. Benjamin T. Spencer (1893–1895)
10. Eugene H. Pearce (1895–1900)
11. John L. Weber (1901–1906)
12. Henry K. Taylor (1906–1909)
13. John J. Tigert (1909–1911)
14. James L. Clark (1911–1919)
15. William B. Campbell (1919–1924)
16. U. V. W. Darlington (1924–1925)

17. David C. Hull (1925–1928)
Interim Walter V. Cropper (1928–1929)
18. Clarence M. Dannelly (1929–1932)
19. Reginald V. Bennett (1932–1937)
20. Paul S. Powell (1937–1950)
21. John F. Baggett (1950–1951)
22. Oscar W. Lever (1951–1959)
23. Dr. Harold P. Hamilton (1959–1970)
24. William E. James (1971–1979)
25. Luther W. White (1979–1988)
26. Paul W. Hartman (1988–1993)
Interim Ray C. Purdom (1993–1994)
27. Wesley H. Poling (1994–2004)
28. Anne C. Federlein (2004–2008)
Interim Dr. M. Michael Fagan (2008)
29. Cheryl D. King (2008–2011)
30. W. Craig Turner (2011–2014)
31. Barton D. Darrell (2014–2019)
President Emeritus (2019–present) Interim Gene Tice (2019)
32. Thomas Mitzel (2020–2024)
33. James Cousins (2025-)

== Academics ==
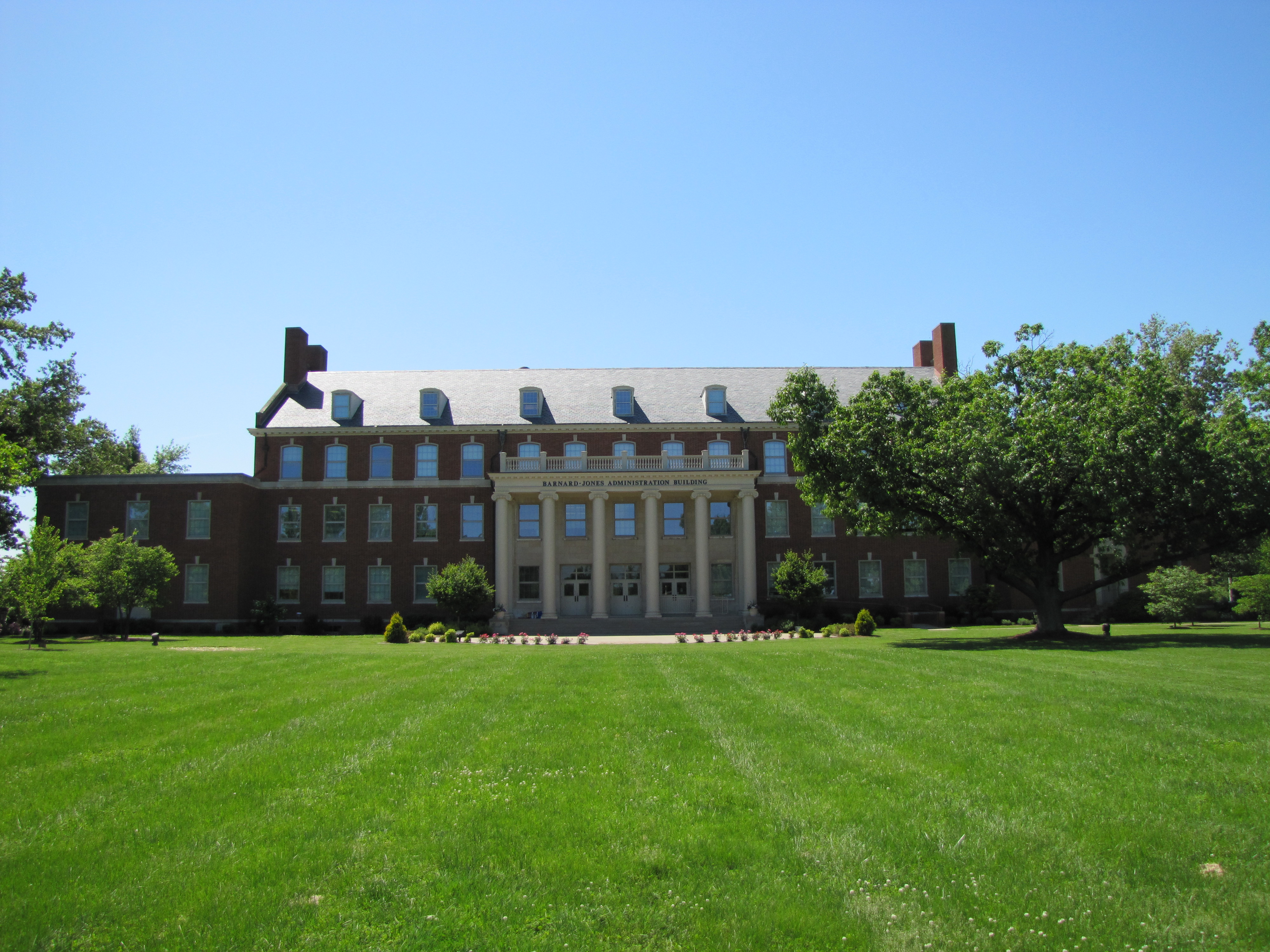
The Barnard-Jones Administration Building

Kentucky Wesleyan offers 30 majors and 13 pre-professional programs and has a student-to-faculty ratio of 13:1. Academics are divided into four divisions: Fine Arts & Humanities, Natural Sciences & Mathematics, Professional Studies, and Social Sciences.

=== Rankings ===
Kentucky Wesleyan College was ranked #24 (tie) in the Regional Colleges South category by U.S. News & World Report in 2022–23. The college was also named #33 in Top Performers on Social mobility.

== Campus ==
Kentucky Wesleyan is located on 55 acres of land. Their campus includes buildings for academics, administration, student residence halls, and athletic facilities.

=== Academic and administrative buildings ===
- Barnard-Jones Administration building, which houses the Office of Admissions and includes Tapscott Chapel and the Snyder Faculty Office building.
- Winchester Campus Community Center, a student space that has meeting spaces, student organization offices, and the campus security office.
- Hocker Family Dining Center/Greenwell Library and Learning Center, a large building that includes the dining hall, library, computer labs, student work spaces, and group and individual study spaces. This building connects to the Winchester Center for student ease of access.
- Ralph Center for Fine Arts and Communication Arts, an academic building housing the majority of the Fine Arts and Humanities degree programs and the auditorium.
- Yu Hak Hahn Center for the Sciences, an academic building that includes the majority of the Natural Sciences & Mathematics and some Social Sciences degree program classes.

=== Athletic facilities ===
The campus includes both student athletic facilities and athlete spaces.

- Jones Gymnasium/Woodward Health and Recreation Center, home to the practice facilities for the university's basketball teams and student health resources.
- Panther Hitting Facility, where university baseball and softball teams practice.
- Panther Park and Foster Field, where the baseball and softball teams compete.
- Panther Field, where the soccer teams practice and compete.
- Bullet Wilson Field at Steele Stadium, where the university's football teams practice and compete.

== Student life ==
Kentucky Wesleyan offers over 40 student organizations on campus. These range from campus ministry, student government, Greek life, academic, and other special interest clubs. Intramural sports are offered on a seasonal basis.

=== Governing organizations ===
Several student organizations provide leadership for other students and organizations, including:

- Student Government Association (SGA), the self-governing body on campus that provides students with a voice in college affairs, ranging from administrative to social matters. SGA consists of an elected executive council and senate. Two senators represent each class. Elections are open to any interested student.
- Panhellenic Council, the governing body for the national sororities on campus. It fosters cooperation, good will and harmony among the sororities, plans activities and administers policies and regulations governing Recruitment activities.
- Interfraternity Council, which regulates the affairs of the social fraternities, administers rules governing rush and pledging and encourages cooperation and harmony among its members.

=== Media and publications ===
- The Panogram — weekly student newspaper
- 90.3 WKWC — 5,000 watt FM radio station run by students and volunteers

=== Greek life ===
Kentucky Wesleyan has three national fraternities and two national sororities.

=== Campus ministries ===
Kentucky Wesleyan, as a private Christian college, has partnerships with twelve churches of various denominations as well as on-campus services and religious organizations.

== Athletics ==
Kentucky Wesleyan athletics monogram

The Kentucky Wesleyan (KWU) athletic teams are called the Panthers. The college is a member of the Division II ranks of the National Collegiate Athletic Association (NCAA), primarily competing in the Great Midwest Athletic Conference (G-MAC) as a founding member since the 2013–14 academic year. The Panthers previously competed as a charter member of the Great Lakes Valley Conference (GLVC) from 1978–79 to 2011–12 (but was fulfilling its commitments to the final year of competition for its other sports in the GLVC as a full member for the 2012–13 school year; before beginning competition as a full G-MAC member). They also competed in the Kentucky Intercollegiate Athletic Conference (KIAC; now currently known as the River States Conference (RSC) since the 2016–17 school year) of the National Association of Intercollegiate Athletics (NAIA) from 1916–17 to 1954–55.

KWU competes in 13 intercollegiate varsity sports: men's teams include baseball, basketball, football, golf, soccer, tennis, and wrestling; while women's sports include basketball, golf, soccer, softball, tennis, and volleyball.

== Notable alumni ==
- Keelan Cole - professional football player
- Urban Valentine Williams Darlington - former bishop of the Methodist Episcopal Church, South
- G. Lindsey Davis - bishop of the United Methodist Church
- Daniel Z. Gibson - Former President of Washington College
- Edgar Hager (1868–1935), criminal defense lawyer, Mayor of Ashland, Kentucky, and President of the Kentucky Municipal League.
- Ray Harper - college basketball coach
- John Wesley Hughes - founder of Asbury University and Kingswood College in Kentucky
- Joseph Jackson – assistant drama editor at The New York World and Hollywood screenwriter.
- Doug Moseley - Kentucky state senator and United Methodist minister
- Paul A. Porter - former Federal Communications Commission chairman
- Stanley Forman Reed - former Justice of the United States Supreme Court
- Jody Richards - former Speaker of the House, Kentucky House of Representatives
- Roy Hunter Short - Bishop of The Methodist Church and the United Methodist Church
- A. J. Smith - Executive Vice President and General Manager of the San Diego Chargers
- Benjamin T. Spencer - scholar of American literature and professor at Ohio Wesleyan University
- Edward Lewis Tullis - bishop of the Methodist Episcopal Church, South and the United Methodist Church
- Cory Wade - professional baseball player
- Barton D. Darrell- Attorney and Fellow-American College of Trial Lawyers; Chancellor of HealthForce Kentucky; President Emeritus-Kentucky Wesleyan College
- Don Stepner- Attorney and past President of the Kentucky Bar Association
- George Tinsley -Two-time All-American basketball player, Professional basketball player, Business success and Founder of PenGeo, Inc which owns 60 food franchises; author
- Ray Solley- Talent Coordinator for Johnny Carson's "The Tonight Show"; worked with Siskel Ebert's "Sneak Previews", worked with Samuel Goldwyn Company and Paramount Television
- Dr. Thomas Meredith- President, Western Kentucky University; Chancellor, University of Alabama System; Chancellor, University of Georgia System; Commissioner, Board of Trustees of State Institutions and Higher Learning of Mississippi.
