= 1916 United States presidential election in Kentucky =

- November 7, 1916

All 13 Kentucky votes to the Electoral College

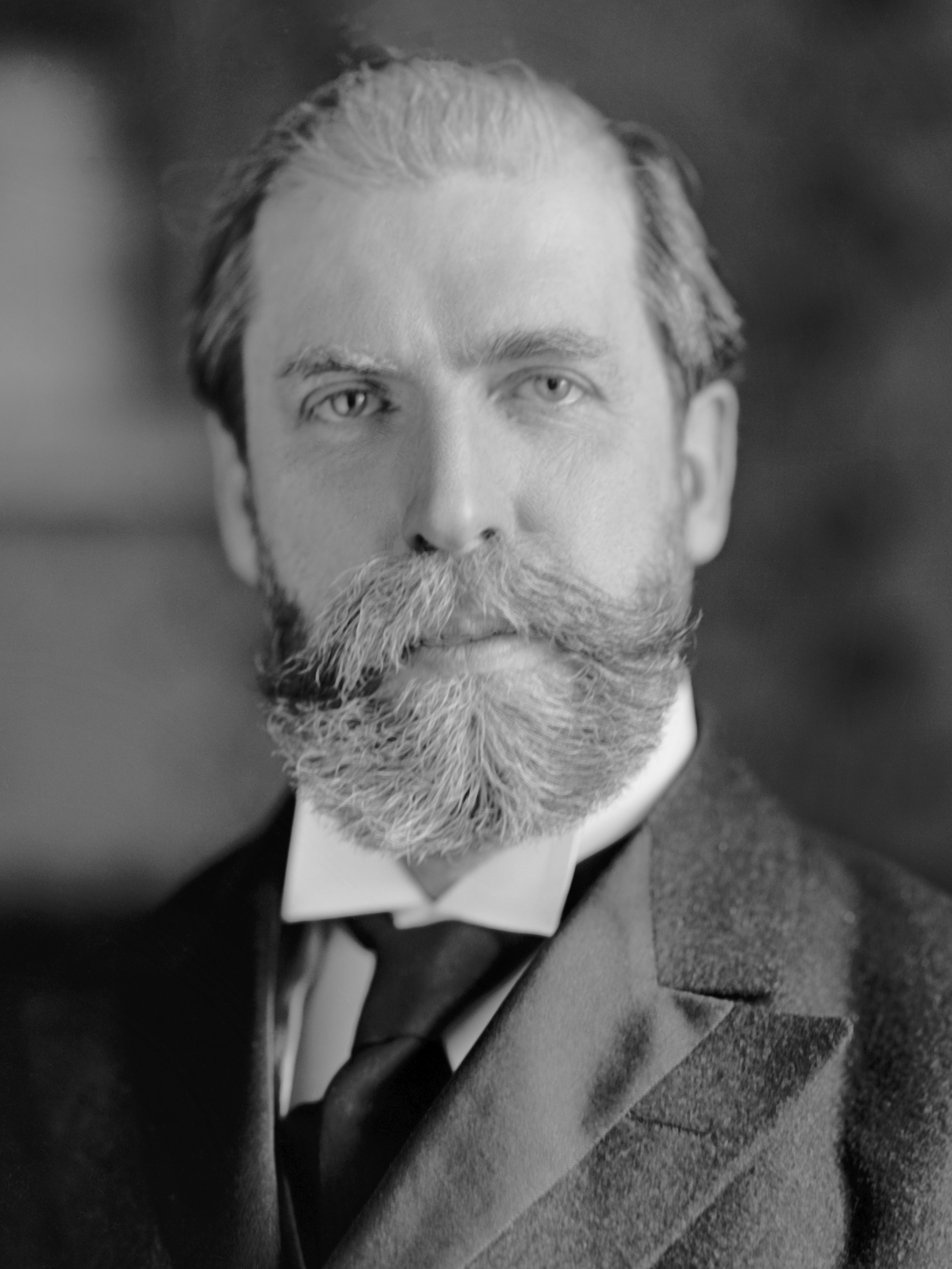
Nominee	Woodrow Wilson	Charles Evans Hughes
Party	Democratic	Republican
Home state	New Jersey	New York
Running mate	Thomas R. Marshall	Charles W. Fairbanks
Electoral vote	13	0
Popular vote	269,990	241,854
Percentage	51.91%	46.50%
County results
Wilson
40–50%
50–60%
60–70%
70–80%
80–90%
Hughes
40–50%
50–60%
60–70%
70–80%
80–90%
90–100%
Tie
<50%
President before election
Woodrow Wilson
Democratic
Elected President
Woodrow Wilson
Democratic

The 1916 United States presidential election in Kentucky took place on November 7, 1916, as part of the 1916 United States presidential election. Voters chose thirteen representatives, or electors to the Electoral College, who voted for president and vice president.

Ever since the Civil War, Kentucky had been shaped politically by divisions created by that war between secessionist, Democratic counties and Unionist, Republican ones, although the state as a whole leaned Democratic throughout this era and the GOP had carried the state only once – by a very narrow margin in 1896 when northern parts of the state were affected by hostility towards William Jennings Bryan, and state native John M. Palmer drew votes from the Democrats.

Unlike the other former Confederate states, Kentucky was not able to disfranchise its relatively small black population which had shrunk significantly in the late nineteenth century due to migration out of the South, in the 1900s, and this helped the Republicans carry the governorship in 1907 and narrowly fail to do so in 1915. Reunited after the 1912 debacle between William Howard Taft and Theodore Roosevelt, the GOP under Charles Evans Hughes visited the state in September and thought it could win a substantial plurality. Wilson also visited Kentucky in September, though for a large part of the fall the Republicans continued to believe they possessed a chance of carrying Kentucky's thirteen electoral votes, after another campaign tour with Theodore Roosevelt. However, by the second week of October, polls were suggesting that Wilson would comfortably carry Kentucky. By the end of the month, polls suggested that Wilson had five-eighths of the vote over Hughes, which if maintained would have been the best Democratic performance in the state between 1872 and 1960.

Ultimately, Wilson carried the state by 5.41 percent, an improvement of around three points on the narrow victories of Alton B. Parker and William Jennings Bryan in Kentucky's previous three two-party contests, although much less than the final polls.

Had Hughes won Kentucky and it's 13 Electoral votes he would have won the presidency.

== Results ==
Presidential Candidate	Running Mate	Party	Electoral Vote (EV)	Popular Vote (PV)	
Woodrow Wilson	Thomas R. Marshall	Democratic	13	269,990	51.91%
Charles Evans Hughes	Charles W. Fairbanks	Republican	0	241,854	46.50%
Allan L. Benson	George Ross Kirkpatrick	Socialist	0	4,734	0.91%
Frank Hanly	Ira Landrith	Prohibition	0	3,036	0.58%
Arthur E. Reimer	Caleb Harrison	Socialist Labor	0	333 (Note: Totals for this candidate were not separated by county but only listed as a statewide total which is included in the statewide aggregate below.)	0.06%
No candidate	—	Progressive	0	122	0.02%

=== Results by county ===
1916 United States presidential election in Kentucky by county
County	Thomas Woodrow Wilson Democratic		Charles Evans Hughes Republican		Allan Louis Benson Socialist		James Franklin Hanly Prohibition		Margin		Total votes cast
County	#	%	#	%	#	%	#	%	#	%	Total votes cast
Adair	1,675	47.14%	1,863	52.43%	1	0.03%	14	0.39%	-188	-5.29%	3,553
Allen	1,647	42.98%	2,147	56.03%	4	0.10%	34	0.89%	-500	-13.05%	3,832
Anderson	1,521	58.21%	1,065	40.76%	1	0.04%	26	1.00%	456	17.45%	2,613
Ballard	2,222	74.02%	692	23.05%	75	2.50%	13	0.43%	1,530	50.97%	3,002
Barren	3,370	57.24%	2,462	41.81%	23	0.39%	33	0.56%	908	15.42%	5,888
Bath	1,796	56.48%	1,360	42.77%	8	0.25%	16	0.50%	436	13.71%	3,180
Bell	1,373	28.80%	3,321	69.67%	54	1.13%	19	0.40%	-1,948	-40.86%	4,767
Boone	2,008	78.81%	531	20.84%	0	0.00%	9	0.35%	1,477	57.97%	2,548
Bourbon	2,715	55.18%	2,167	44.04%	7	0.14%	31	0.63%	548	11.14%	4,920
Boyd	2,738	47.68%	2,883	50.20%	62	1.08%	60	1.04%	-145	-2.52%	5,743
Boyle	2,052	57.45%	1,494	41.83%	3	0.08%	23	0.64%	558	15.62%	3,572
Bracken	1,676	59.37%	1,082	38.33%	47	1.66%	18	0.64%	594	21.04%	2,823
Breathitt	2,067	56.23%	1,584	43.09%	3	0.08%	22	0.60%	483	13.14%	3,676
Breckinridge	2,172	45.35%	2,549	53.23%	13	0.27%	55	1.15%	-377	-7.87%	4,789
Bullitt	1,508	64.39%	826	35.27%	1	0.04%	7	0.30%	682	29.12%	2,342
Butler	1,158	31.75%	2,456	67.34%	10	0.27%	23	0.63%	-1,298	-35.59%	3,647
Caldwell	1,605	48.01%	1,672	50.01%	49	1.47%	17	0.51%	-67	-2.00%	3,343
Calloway	3,334	73.88%	1,026	22.73%	135	2.99%	18	0.40%	2,308	51.14%	4,513
Campbell	7,290	53.62%	5,696	41.90%	513	3.77%	96	0.71%	1,594	11.72%	13,595
Carlisle	1,646	75.33%	494	22.61%	33	1.51%	12	0.55%	1,152	52.72%	2,185
Carroll	1,757	76.03%	535	23.15%	1	0.04%	18	0.78%	1,222	52.88%	2,311
Carter	1,954	40.55%	2,818	58.48%	19	0.39%	28	0.58%	-864	-17.93%	4,819
Casey	1,352	40.49%	1,949	58.37%	8	0.24%	30	0.90%	-597	-17.88%	3,339
Christian	3,644	43.71%	4,594	55.11%	54	0.65%	44	0.53%	-950	-11.40%	8,336
Clark	2,620	59.71%	1,731	39.45%	6	0.14%	31	0.71%	889	20.26%	4,388
Clay	820	26.43%	2,271	73.21%	5	0.16%	6	0.19%	-1,451	-46.78%	3,102
Clinton	379	22.93%	1,260	76.23%	0	0.00%	14	0.85%	-881	-53.30%	1,653
Crittenden	1,455	44.20%	1,794	54.50%	19	0.58%	24	0.73%	-339	-10.30%	3,292
Cumberland	653	31.67%	1,394	67.60%	0	0.00%	15	0.73%	-741	-35.94%	2,062
Daviess	5,396	56.37%	4,078	42.60%	29	0.30%	70	0.73%	1,318	13.77%	9,573
Edmonson	935	40.74%	1,339	58.34%	7	0.31%	14	0.61%	-404	-17.60%	2,295
Elliott	1,151	68.23%	525	31.12%	1	0.06%	10	0.59%	626	37.11%	1,687
Estill	1,180	43.30%	1,524	55.93%	0	0.00%	21	0.77%	-344	-12.62%	2,725
Fayette	6,348	53.30%	5,472	45.95%	19	0.16%	70	0.59%	876	7.36%	11,909
Fleming	2,240	54.41%	1,836	44.60%	1	0.02%	40	0.97%	404	9.81%	4,117
Floyd	2,217	54.53%	1,823	44.84%	16	0.39%	10	0.25%	394	9.69%	4,066
Franklin	3,345	69.67%	1,426	29.70%	12	0.25%	18	0.37%	1,919	39.97%	4,801
Fulton	2,200	73.53%	747	24.97%	17	0.57%	28	0.94%	1,453	48.56%	2,992
Gallatin	1,060	78.69%	283	21.01%	0	0.00%	4	0.30%	777	57.68%	1,347
Garrard	1,375	45.42%	1,628	53.78%	4	0.13%	20	0.66%	-253	-8.36%	3,027
Grant	1,841	62.24%	1,078	36.44%	3	0.10%	36	1.22%	763	25.79%	2,958
Graves	5,197	71.44%	1,930	26.53%	131	1.80%	17	0.23%	3,267	44.91%	7,275
Grayson	1,953	44.77%	2,368	54.29%	13	0.30%	28	0.64%	-415	-9.51%	4,362
Green	1,239	46.40%	1,412	52.88%	0	0.00%	19	0.71%	-173	-6.48%	2,670
Greenup	1,820	48.34%	1,821	48.37%	92	2.44%	32	0.85%	-1	-0.03%	3,765
Hancock	833	46.41%	918	51.14%	32	1.78%	12	0.67%	-85	-4.74%	1,795
Hardin	3,272	63.08%	1,887	36.38%	16	0.31%	12	0.23%	1,385	26.70%	5,187
Harlan	690	20.09%	2,670	77.73%	53	1.54%	22	0.64%	-1,980	-57.64%	3,435
Harrison	2,778	65.43%	1,409	33.18%	7	0.16%	52	1.22%	1,369	32.24%	4,246
Hart	2,048	49.53%	2,031	49.12%	36	0.87%	20	0.48%	17	0.41%	4,135
Henderson	3,699	60.73%	2,218	36.41%	125	2.05%	49	0.80%	1,481	24.31%	6,091
Henry	2,595	66.11%	1,302	33.17%	5	0.13%	23	0.59%	1,293	32.94%	3,925
Hickman	1,982	77.42%	539	21.05%	24	0.94%	15	0.59%	1,443	56.37%	2,560
Hopkins	3,757	50.06%	3,615	48.17%	102	1.36%	31	0.41%	142	1.89%	7,505
Jackson	252	11.26%	1,968	87.90%	3	0.13%	16	0.71%	-1,716	-76.64%	2,239
Jefferson	28,840	49.46%	28,386	48.68%	883	1.51%	205	0.35%	454	0.78%	58,314
Jessamine	1,727	55.39%	1,326	42.53%	0	0.00%	65	2.08%	401	12.86%	3,118
Johnson	1,253	32.84%	2,500	65.51%	41	1.07%	22	0.58%	-1,247	-32.68%	3,816
Kenton	10,402	64.28%	5,267	32.55%	411	2.54%	103	0.64%	5,135	31.73%	16,183
Knott	1,454	71.66%	571	28.14%	0	0.00%	4	0.20%	883	43.52%	2,029
Knox	1,126	25.81%	3,192	73.18%	24	0.55%	20	0.46%	-2,066	-47.36%	4,362
Larue	1,350	58.72%	936	40.71%	1	0.04%	12	0.52%	414	18.01%	2,299
Laurel	1,171	32.08%	2,383	65.29%	78	2.14%	18	0.49%	-1,212	-33.21%	3,650
Lawrence	1,910	49.20%	1,928	49.67%	18	0.46%	26	0.67%	-18	-0.46%	3,882
Lee	793	40.86%	1,135	58.48%	1	0.05%	12	0.62%	-342	-17.62%	1,941
Leslie	133	8.04%	1,516	91.60%	2	0.12%	4	0.24%	-1,383	-83.56%	1,655
Letcher	1,121	33.32%	2,220	65.99%	12	0.36%	11	0.33%	-1,099	-32.67%	3,364
Lewis	1,276	34.40%	2,324	62.66%	69	1.86%	40	1.08%	-1,048	-28.26%	3,709
Lincoln	2,212	53.22%	1,868	44.95%	41	0.99%	35	0.84%	344	8.28%	4,156
Livingston	1,287	55.84%	923	40.04%	83	3.60%	12	0.52%	364	15.79%	2,305
Logan	3,373	56.71%	2,501	42.05%	31	0.52%	43	0.72%	872	14.66%	5,948
Lyon	1,191	60.77%	748	38.16%	9	0.46%	12	0.61%	443	22.60%	1,960
Madison	3,295	51.94%	3,017	47.56%	10	0.16%	22	0.35%	278	4.38%	6,344
Magoffin	1,433	47.83%	1,535	51.23%	5	0.17%	23	0.77%	-102	-3.40%	2,996
Marion	2,063	59.33%	1,396	40.15%	3	0.09%	15	0.43%	667	19.18%	3,477
Marshall	2,263	64.11%	1,201	34.02%	46	1.30%	20	0.57%	1,062	30.08%	3,530
Martin	280	19.96%	1,100	78.40%	15	1.07%	8	0.57%	-820	-58.45%	1,403
Mason	2,820	56.40%	2,127	42.54%	7	0.14%	46	0.92%	693	13.86%	5,000
McCracken	4,356	56.92%	3,058	39.96%	211	2.76%	28	0.37%	1,298	16.96%	7,653
McCreary	324	16.36%	1,630	82.28%	22	1.11%	5	0.25%	-1,306	-65.93%	1,981
McLean	1,589	51.37%	1,439	46.52%	41	1.33%	24	0.78%	150	4.85%	3,093
Meade	1,317	60.86%	803	37.11%	36	1.66%	8	0.37%	514	23.75%	2,164
Menifee	730	66.36%	369	33.55%	1	0.09%	0	0.00%	361	32.82%	1,100
Mercer	2,093	57.20%	1,531	41.84%	4	0.11%	31	0.85%	562	15.36%	3,659
Metcalfe	1,046	48.16%	1,107	50.97%	4	0.18%	15	0.69%	-61	-2.81%	2,172
Monroe	882	30.43%	2,008	69.29%	1	0.03%	7	0.24%	-1,126	-38.85%	2,898
Montgomery	1,705	58.33%	1,195	40.88%	12	0.41%	11	0.38%	510	17.45%	2,923
Morgan	2,319	66.97%	1,123	32.43%	7	0.20%	14	0.40%	1,196	34.54%	3,463
Muhlenberg	2,900	43.93%	3,533	53.52%	146	2.21%	22	0.33%	-633	-9.59%	6,601
Nelson	2,639	62.54%	1,546	36.64%	4	0.09%	31	0.73%	1,093	25.90%	4,220
Nicholas	1,829	64.67%	964	34.09%	6	0.21%	29	1.03%	865	30.59%	2,828
Ohio	2,723	43.83%	3,286	52.89%	156	2.51%	48	0.77%	-563	-9.06%	6,213
Oldham	1,455	68.76%	642	30.34%	5	0.24%	14	0.66%	813	38.42%	2,116
Owen	2,911	80.70%	663	18.38%	10	0.28%	23	0.64%	2,248	62.32%	3,607
Owsley	197	14.25%	1,173	84.88%	3	0.22%	9	0.65%	-976	-70.62%	1,382
Pendleton	1,728	58.12%	1,206	40.57%	13	0.44%	26	0.87%	522	17.56%	2,973
Perry	904	28.25%	2,217	69.28%	53	1.66%	26	0.81%	-1,313	-41.03%	3,200
Pike	3,414	44.34%	4,212	54.71%	31	0.40%	42	0.55%	-798	-10.36%	7,699
Powell	757	56.32%	587	43.68%	0	0.00%	0	0.00%	170	12.65%	1,344
Pulaski	2,531	37.54%	4,136	61.35%	16	0.24%	59	0.88%	-1,605	-23.81%	6,742
Robertson	663	61.22%	415	38.32%	0	0.00%	5	0.46%	248	22.90%	1,083
Rockcastle	968	33.21%	1,932	66.28%	8	0.27%	7	0.24%	-964	-33.07%	2,915
Rowan	881	47.91%	941	51.17%	5	0.27%	12	0.65%	-60	-3.26%	1,839
Russell	859	39.30%	1,298	59.38%	5	0.23%	24	1.10%	-439	-20.08%	2,186
Scott	2,611	63.30%	1,486	36.02%	7	0.17%	21	0.51%	1,125	27.27%	4,125
Shelby	2,919	60.76%	1,863	38.78%	5	0.10%	17	0.35%	1,056	21.98%	4,804
Simpson	1,887	66.03%	955	33.41%	5	0.17%	11	0.38%	932	32.61%	2,858
Spencer	1,271	68.00%	591	31.62%	1	0.05%	6	0.32%	680	36.38%	1,869
Taylor	1,360	50.07%	1,332	49.04%	5	0.18%	19	0.70%	28	1.03%	2,716
Todd	2,051	54.24%	1,671	44.19%	28	0.74%	31	0.82%	380	10.05%	3,781
Trigg	1,722	51.73%	1,533	46.05%	60	1.80%	14	0.42%	189	5.68%	3,329
Trimble	1,319	82.23%	259	16.15%	5	0.31%	21	1.31%	1,060	66.08%	1,604
Union	2,754	68.99%	1,184	29.66%	49	1.23%	5	0.13%	1,570	39.33%	3,992
Warren	4,228	57.96%	3,002	41.15%	11	0.15%	54	0.74%	1,226	16.81%	7,295
Washington	1,654	49.77%	1,654	49.77%	3	0.09%	12	0.36%	0	0.00%	3,323
Wayne	1,373	45.25%	1,638	53.99%	1	0.03%	22	0.73%	-265	-8.73%	3,034
Webster	2,673	55.65%	2,082	43.35%	20	0.42%	28	0.58%	591	12.30%	4,803
Whitley	1,171	22.79%	3,919	76.27%	33	0.64%	15	0.29%	-2,748	-53.48%	5,138
Wolfe	1,108	62.99%	645	36.67%	0	0.00%	6	0.34%	463	26.32%	1,759
Woodford	1,786	57.50%	1,300	41.85%	9	0.29%	11	0.35%	486	15.65%	3,106
Totals	269,990	51.91%	241,854	46.50%	4,734	0.91%	3,036	0.58%	28,136	5.41%	520,069

== See also ==
- United States presidential elections in Kentucky
