= Lawrence W. Hager =

American newspaper publisher (1890–1982)

Lawrence W. Hager Sr.
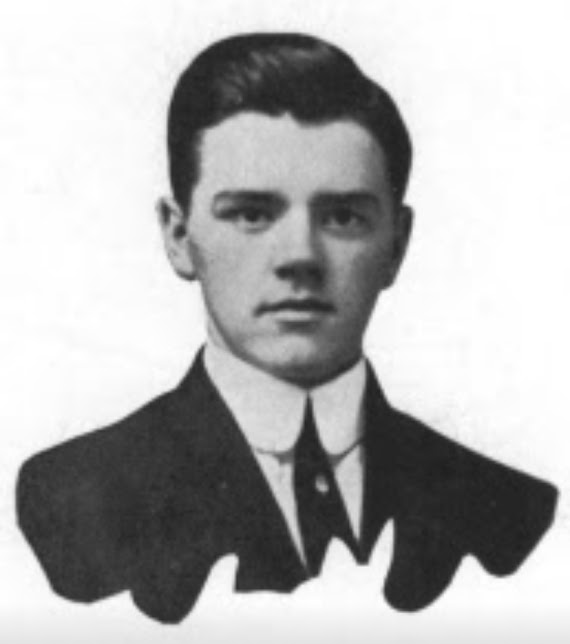
- Hager in 1909
- Born: May 28, 1890; Louisville, Kentucky, U.S.
- Died: December 25, 1982 (aged 92); Owensboro, Kentucky, U.S.
- Education: Centre College
- Political party: Democratic
- Spouse: Martha Augusta Brown (m. 1921)
- Children: 2
- Parent(s): Samuel Wilber Hager; Elizabeth Woods (White) Hager
- Relatives: Edgar Hager (cousin); Addison White (cousin); Hugh Lawson White (cousin); John White (great-uncle); John D. White (uncle); Laura Rogers White (aunt)

Lawrence White Hager Sr. (May 28, 1890 – December 25, 1982) was an American newspaper publisher, broadcasting executive. He served as director of the Southern Newspapers Association (1947–1950), Owensboro Publishing Company, and the Kentucky Broadcasting Company, president, owner, and operator of WOMI radio station, president of the Kentucky Press Association, and owner of the Messenger-Inquirer. Hager died in 1982.

Hager founded several clubs in Owensboro. He founded the Owensboro Rotary Club in 1915, the city's first civic club for men. He also founded the Goodfellows club in 1916, which provided gifts and clothing for disadvantaged children.

== Biography ==
Lawrence White Hager was born on May 28, 1890, in Louisville, Kentucky, to Samuel Wilber Hager and Elizabeth "Bessie" Woods White. His father served as Kentucky State Treasurer and auditor between 1900 and 1908. His mother was a member of the White family, a wealthy and politically influential family in Kentucky. Through his mother he was related to John D. White, Addison White, and Hugh Lawson White, all of whom served in U.S. congress. He earned a Master of Arts and graduated cum laude and salutatorian from Centre College in 1909. While still enrolled in college, he got his first job as a reporter for The State Journal in Frankfort during the summer of 1908. In 1910, He was offered a scholarship to Harvard Law School, but declined, instead deciding to join his father at the Messenger-Inquirer in Owensboro. He helped his father with the newspaper, while also learning every detail of the business. In 1917, he enlisted in the U.S. Army during World War I, and was an artillery officer in France until the end of the war. On December 27, 1918, Hagers father died, a short time before he would return from France. When he returned, he became editor of the Messenger-Inquirer. On June 5, 1921, he married Martha Augusta Brown. He and Martha had two children, Lawrence W. Jr. and John S. Hager.

In 1913, Hager helped raise support for the creation of the Owensboro-Daviess Chamber of Commerce. He would eventually become a charter member of the chamber, and be elected the chambers board of directors.

In 1915, Hager was one of the main founders of the Owensboro Rotary Club. In 1916, he founded the Goodfellows Club, an organization which provided gifts and clothing for disadvantaged children.

In 1928, Hager founded the Owensboro Publishing Company. In 1929, he bought the Messenger from Urey Woodson, and consolidated the city's two newspapers, forming the Messenger-Inquirer.

In 1938, he founded WOMI, Owensboro's first radio station.

Hager was a member of the board of trustees for Kentucky Wesleyan College, and helped raise over US$1,000,000 to move the college to Owensboro in 1951.

Hager died on December 25, 1982, in Owensboro, Kentucky, after a brief illness. He was interred at Rose Hill Cemetery in Owensboro.
