= Edgar Hager =

American lawyer and politician

5th President, Kentucky Municipal League
- In office 1934–1935
- Preceded by: Paul Morton, Lexington
- Succeeded by: Edward G. Scott, Paducah

24th Mayor of Ashland, Kentucky
- In office January 1, 1932 – December 19, 1935
- Preceded by: William Frailie
- Succeeded by: Will Simpson

Personal details
- Born: December 7, 1868 Paintsville, Kentucky, US
- Died: December 19, 1935 (aged 66) Ashland, Kentucky, US
- Party: Democratic Party
- Spouse(s): Lucie Prichard (1879–1902); Sylvia "Kittie" Wiley
- Children: Edgar Browne, Jr. (born 1899); Virginia Patton (1901–1979); Samuel Patton, II (1933–1933); Kittie Brown (born 1934)
- Parent(s): Samuel Patton Hager; Angeline "Angie" Brown

Edgar Browne Hager (1868–1935) was a criminal defense lawyer known for his oratory skills, mayor of Ashland, Kentucky, and president of the Kentucky Municipal League.

== Early life and education ==
Hager's father was Samuel Patton Hager, who worked as a lawyer in Ohio and later moved to Charleston, West Virginia to run a coal corporation. Hager came to Ashland with his parents in April 1881, becoming a student at Beech Grove Academy in 1884.

Hager went on to graduate with an AB from Kentucky Wesleyan College in June 1888 as a Phi Delta Phi. After graduation he worked as a superintendent of schools in Catlettsburg, Kentucky then resigned to pursuit law studies. In June 1891, he graduated simultaneously with an LLB from Boston University School of Law and an AM degree from Wesleyan. In August 1891 he was admitted to the Kentucky bar.

== Legal career ==
Hager became a prominent criminal lawyer in Ashland, Kentucky and in Chattanooga, Tennessee, working across several other state boundaries. As a lawyer, he was noted for his oratory abilities.

In 1907, he was appointed state auditor's agent by his cousin, state auditor Samuel Wilber Hager.

In 1929, Hager was designated special judge in a case in the Floyd Circuit Court between J. H. Nunnery and the Pike Floyd Coal Company when the regular judge, C. B. Wheeler, was disqualified.

== Political career ==
Hager ran in the Democratic primary for the House of Representatives in Kentucky's 9th congressional district three times, in 1906, 1908, and 1910. In 1908, he was defeated by later US Representative James Nicholas Kehoe. In 1910, Hager was beaten by William J. Fields, who went on to become Governor of Kentucky. In 1918, during the final days of WWI and its immediate aftermath, Hager traveled to France with the YMCA.

In 1932, at the age of 64, Hager was elected mayor of Ashland, Kentucky. Immediately after becoming Mayor of Ashland he reached out to neighboring cities across state lines, such as Portsmouth, Ohio, to forge closer relationships. Hager engaged in the purchase of a police radio system, funded by Ashland's merchants. In 1933, he became the fifth person to be elected president of the Kentucky Municipal League, succeeding City Manager Paul Morton of Lexington. Hager, who had previously served as vice president of the league under Paul Morton, started his term on January 1 of 1934. Hager was succeeded as president of the Kentucky Municipal League by (also Democrat) Mayor Edward G. Scott of Paducah. Hager served as Mayor of Ashland until he died in office in December 1935.

Edgar Hager in Polk Johnson's 1912
A History of Kentucky and Kentuckians

One of the most accomplished and cultured men that ever graced the Kentucky bar, Edgar Browne Hager, of Ashland, Boyd county, has won distinguished prestige during his professional career, his vigorous mentality, scholarly attainments and comprehensive knowledge of the law winning for him an enviable record. A thorough master of the legal rules and rulings, his powers of expression are broad, keen and clear, while his judgment is clear and impartial, and his integrity unimpeachable.

== Family, death, and legacy ==
Edgar Hager had five brothers, of whom two died at an early age, and a half-brother through his father's first wife. He was cousins with Louisville politician and state auditor Samuel Wilber Hager (1858–1918), the father of the journalist and Owensboro Messenger-Inquirer publisher Lawrence W. Hager (1890–1982). Edgar Hager was also first cousins with Judge John Franklin Hager (1852–1933) of Ashland, after whom the city's Hager Elementary School was named.

Edgar Hager married Lucie Vinson Prichard from Louisa, Kentucky on June 21, 1898. Ms. Hager died on January 20, 1902. By then Edgar Hager had two children, Edgar Browne Hager Jr. (1899–19??) and Virginia Patton Hager (1901–1979). In their later lives, Edgar Jr. lived in Ashland, Virginia in Louisa. In his later life, Edgar Sr. married Sylvia "Kittie" Wiley of Lewisburg, West Virginia with whom he had a son, Samuel Patton Hager, II (b. and d. April 10, 1933) and an adopted daughter, Kittie Brown Hager (born 1934).

Hager died December 19, 1935, of a heart attack. He was buried at Ashland Cemetery. Published in 1912, A History of Kentucky and Kentuckians contains a detailed biography of the lawyer/politician.
