= Olive San Louie Anderson =

American author (1852–1886)

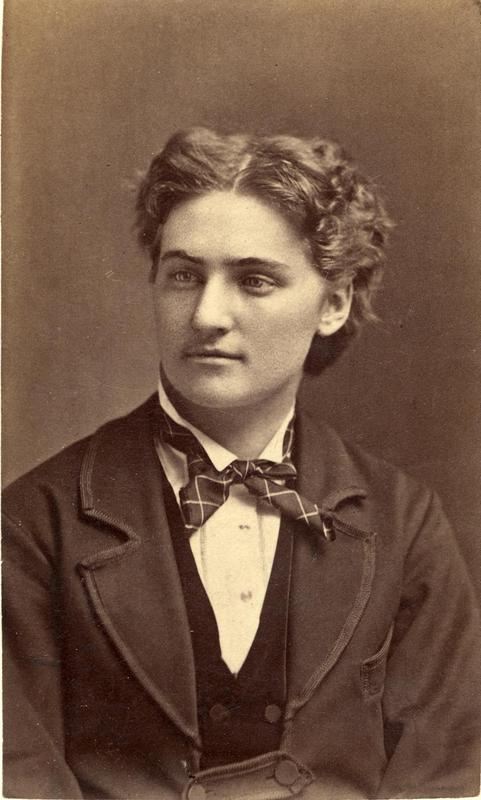
- Anderson in the 1870s
- Born: September 30, 1852; Lexington, Ohio
- Died: June 5, 1886 (aged 33); Sacramento River, California
- Education: University of Michigan
- Occupation: Author
- Writing career
- Notable works: An American Girl, and Her Four Years in a Boys’ College

Olive San Louie Anderson (1852–1886) was an American writer and member of the first class of women students who entered the University of Michigan when it became coeducational in 1871. The university had admitted Madelon Stockwell (1845–1924), its first female student, in January 1870. In fall 1871, the university admitted thirty-three more women, two in law, eighteen in medicine, and thirteen in the Department of Science, Literature, and the Arts. Anderson was one of the thirteen.

Anderson also went by the name Santa Louie Anderson.

== Biography ==
Born on September 30, 1852, in Lexington, Ohio, she was the daughter of Alice Cook and Dr. Hugh P. Anderson, who died when she was young. The family spent some time on the Iowa frontier, returning eventually to Mansfield, Ohio where she graduated from high school in 1869. After a short time teaching in public schools, she prepared for entry to the University of Michigan, passing her entrance examinations in 1871.

Anderson did well at Michigan and graduated in 1875. She was the only woman honored with an "appointment", as it was then called, to speak at commencement. She planned a career in medicine but instead became a teacher. After living for a while in San Francisco she took a post teaching Greek and Latin at a college in Santa Barbara. While there, she wrote short sketches for eastern newspapers about the "quaint" Spanish lifestyle of the area. It was at this time that she wrote her autobiographical novel An American Girl. The book was published, titled, in full, An American Girl, and Her Four Years in a Boys' College, in 1878 under the pen name "SOLA", an anagram of her initials. The book was published by D. Appleton and Company, a prestigious New York City publisher.

When the college at which she was teaching closed, she taught in various private schools until, in May 1882, she became a partner in a private school in San Rafael. She later served as this school's principal.

== Death ==
In June 1886, at age 33, Anderson spent a month with an "Artistic League" on San Francisco Bay, sometimes staying aboard a boat and sometimes on shore. During this time she was gathering material for a book about California and preparing to study abroad. Her group traveled up the Sacramento River aboard the yacht Ariel. On the morning of June 5, the last day of the trip, Anderson and five others left the yacht to swim in the river. She suffered severe cramps and drowned before the others could rescue her. Her family sent her body to Mansfield, Ohio, where they buried her beside her father. Her friend Elizabeth C. Curtis collected some of Anderson's final writings and printed 500 copies as Stories and Sketches in her memory.

== See also ==
- History of the University of Michigan
