= Elijah Phister =

American politician

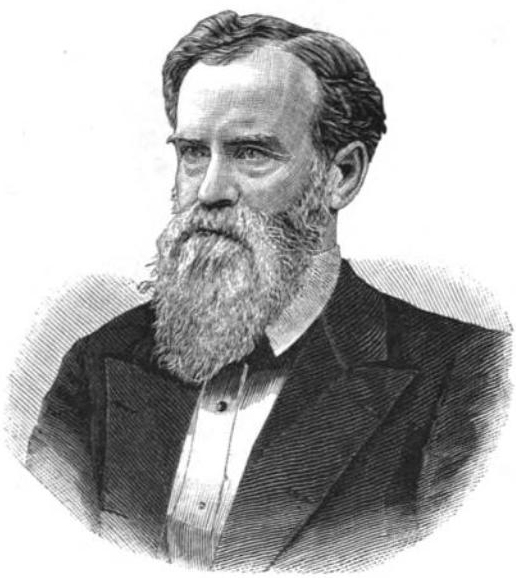

Member of the U.S. House of Representatives from Kentucky's 10th district
- In office March 4, 1879 – March 3, 1883
- Preceded by: John Blades Clarke
- Succeeded by: John D. White

Member of the Kentucky House of Representatives from Mason County
- In office August 5, 1867 – August 7, 1871 Serving with Henry L. Parry (1867–69); R. L. Cooper (1869–71)
- Preceded by: J. W. Gault; Harrison Taylor
- Succeeded by: W. W. Baldwin; R. L. Cooper

Personal details
- Born: October 8, 1822 Maysville, Kentucky
- Died: May 16, 1887 (aged 64) Maysville, Kentucky
- Resting place: Maysville City Cemetery
- Party: Democratic
- Spouse: Jane A. Paddock (m. 1847)
- Education: Augusta College
- Profession: Lawyer

Elijah Conner Phister (October 8, 1822 – May 16, 1887) was a United States representative from Kentucky. He was born in Maysville, Kentucky. He attended the Seminary of Rand and Richardson in Maysville and graduated from Augusta College in Augusta, Kentucky, in August 1840. He then studied law in Philadelphia under John Sergeant and at Payne & Waller in Maysville. He was admitted to the bar and commenced practice in 1844.

== Political career ==
Phister served two terms as mayor of Maysville in 1847 and 1848. He was a circuit judge 1856–1862 and a member of the Kentucky House of Representatives 1867–1871. He was appointed one of the commissioners to revise the Kentucky statutes in 1872 but declined. Phister was elected as a Democrat to the Forty-sixth and Forty-seventh Congresses (March 4, 1879 – March 3, 1883). After leaving Congress, he resumed the practice of law.

== Personal life ==
Phister married Jane A. Paddock (1830–1923) in 1847 and they had five children. He was a member of the Independent Order of Odd Fellows. Phister died in Maysville, Kentucky in 1887 and was buried in the City Cemetery.

U.S. House of Representatives
Preceded by John B. Clarke	Member of the U.S. House of Representatives from Kentucky's 10th congressional district March 4, 1879 – March 3, 1883 (obsolete district)	Succeeded by John D. White
