= First Christian Church (Ashland, Kentucky) =

Historic church in Kentucky, United States

- First Christian Church of Ashland
- U.S. National Register of Historic Places
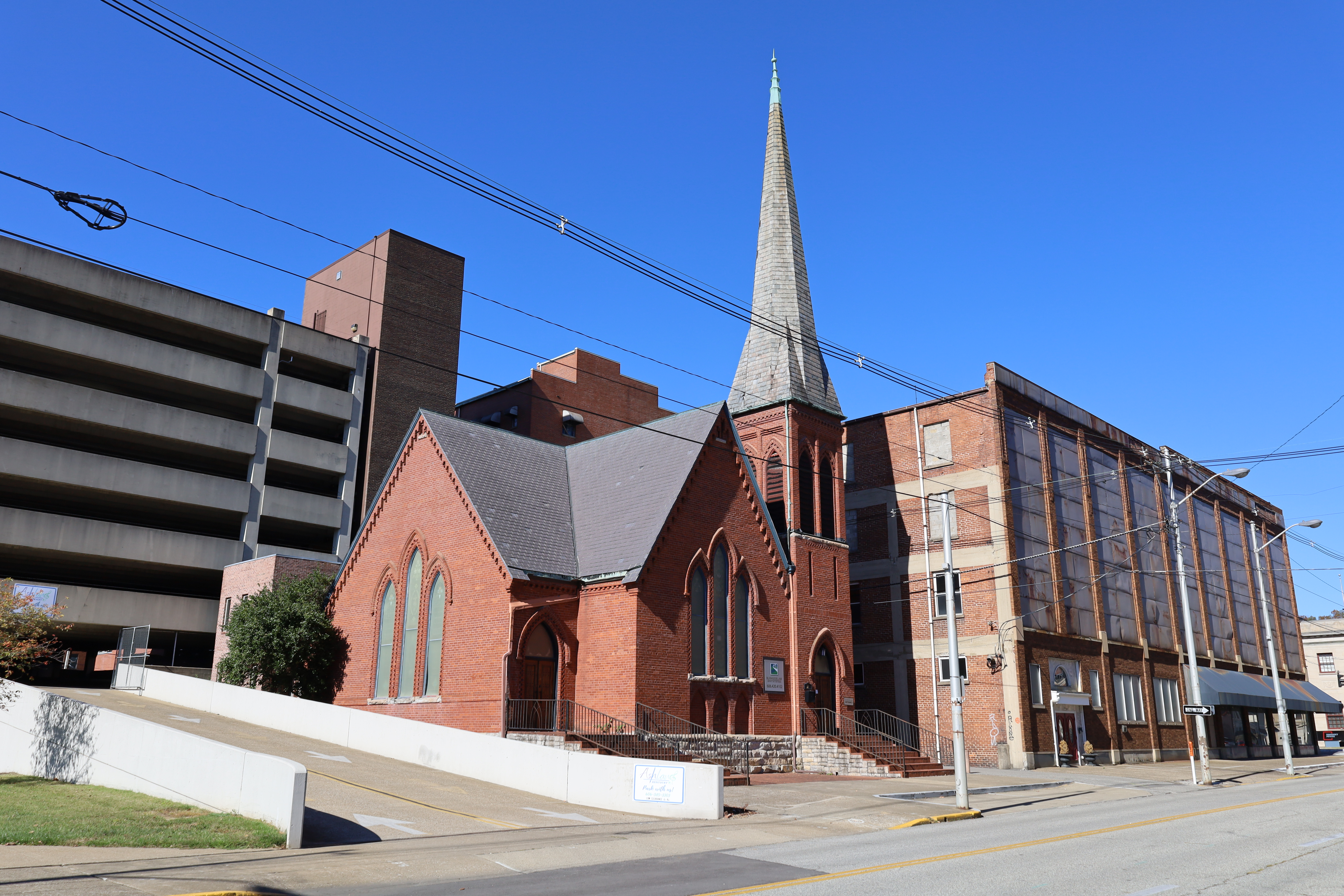
- The church in 2023

- Location within Kentucky Location within the United States
- Location: 315 17th St., Ashland, Kentucky
- Coordinates: 38°28′42″N 82°38′19″W
- Area: less than one acre
- Built: 1890
- Architect: White, Laura
- Architectural style: Late Gothic Revival
- MPS: Ashland MRA
- NRHP reference No.: 90000475
- Added to NRHP: March 22, 1990

The First Christian Church of Ashland (also known as Old Church of Christ Scientist of Ashland; BO-A-89) is a historic church building at 315 17th Street in Ashland, Kentucky. It was built in 1890. The First Christian Church of Ashland moved out in 1913. The building was added to the National Register of Historic Places in 1990.

It was designed by architect Laura Rogers White.

It has also been known as the Old Church of Christ. Scientist, of Ashland.

== See also ==
- National Register of Historic Places listings in Kentucky
