= Benjamin T. Spencer =

American literary critic (1904–1996)

Benjamin Townley Spencer (1904–1996) was a scholar of American literature and a professor at Ohio Wesleyan University.

He graduated from Kentucky Wesleyan College, and received his M.A. and Ph.D. degrees from the University of Cincinnati.

Spencer wrote widely on American literature and on Shakespeare but is best remembered for his great book, The Quest for American Nationality: An American Literary Campaign (1957). In 2008, Robert Milder described it as "an informed and still eminently serviceable account of the multifront 'campaign' for a national literature".

The annual Benjamin T. Spencer Lecture is given at Ohio Wesleyan University in his memory and the Benjamin T. Spencer Professorship in Literature is named in his honor.

== Books ==
- The Quest for Nationality: An American Literary Campaign (1959)
- Patterns of Nationality: Twentieth-Century Literary Versions of America (1981)
