= Edward Lewis Tullis =

Edward Lewis Tullis (March 9, 1917 – October 6, 2005) was an American bishop of the United Methodist Church, and an advocate for women clergy.

Elected as a bishop in 1972, he presided over the Columbia, South Carolina episcopal area and then the Nashville, Tennessee episcopal area until his retirement in 1984. He also served on the Board of Managers, the General Board of Missions, the Board of Managers of the Board of Discipleship, and the General Council on Finance and Administration.

Born in Cincinnati, Ohio, Tullis was a 1939 graduate of Kentucky Wesleyan College and was ordained in the Methodist Episcopal Church, South in 1939. Before his election to the episcopacy in 1972, Tullis served 35 years as a pastor in Methodist churches in Kentucky, during which time he was also a Chaplain in the General Assembly of the Commonwealth of Kentucky.

Tullis served as a trustee of twelve colleges and seminaries. He remained active in retirement and authored several books – First Sermons, Shaping The Church from the Mind of Christ and The Heart of Evangelism – and his penultimate book, The Birth of The Book, which evolved from his experience teaching adult Sunday School for the preceding twenty years at Long's Chapel United Methodist Church in Lake Junaluska, North Carolina. His last book was a history of the Magee Christian Education Foundation, of which he had been a director for 40 years.

In 2004 Bishop Tullis was inducted into the Alumni Hall of Fame of Kentucky Wesleyan. He died aged 88 on October 6, 2005, at his home in Lake Junaluska, North Carolina.
