= Madelon Stockwell =

First woman to earn a bachelor's degree from the University of Michigan

Madelon Stockwell Turner
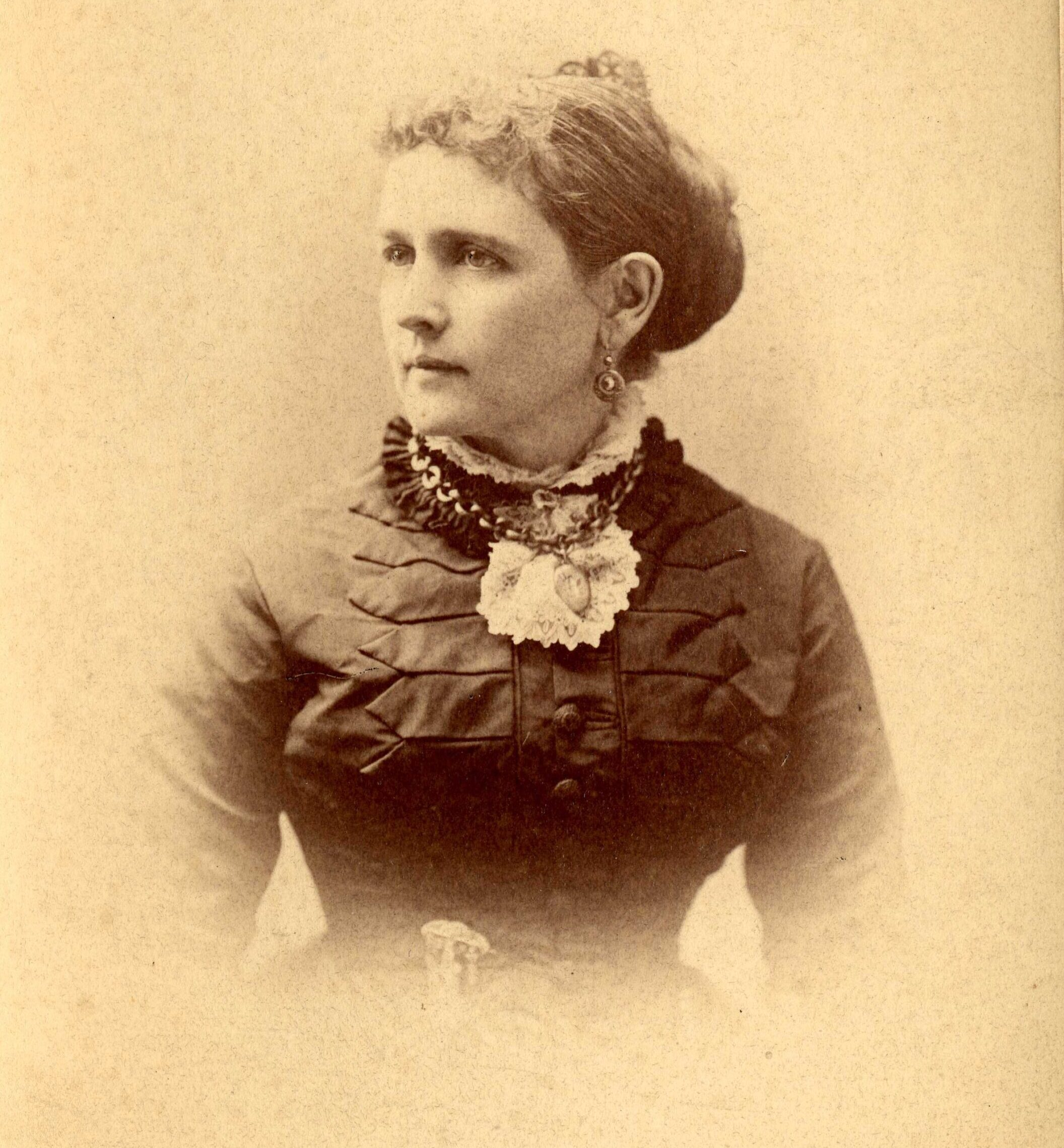
- Born: August 9, 1845
- Died: June 7, 1924 (aged 78); Kalamazoo, Michigan
- Education: University of Michigan
- Known for: First woman to earn a bachelor's degree from the University of Michigan

Madelon Stockwell Turner (August 9, 1845 – June 7, 1924) was an American diarist and the first woman to earn a bachelor's degree from the University of Michigan.

== Biography ==
=== Early life ===
Madelon Louisa Stockwell was born to Louisa Peabody and Reverend Charles F. Stockwell, the first principal of Wesleyan Female Seminary (now Albion College). In 1850, when Stockwell was four years old, he left Michigan in pursuit of a fortune in the California Gold Rush. On his travels, he contracted a disease and died.

=== Education ===
Stockwell studied at Albion College and Kalamazoo College before applying to the University of Michigan under the encouragement of her mentor and teacher Lucinda Stone.

On February 2, 1870, Stockwell began her first semester at the University of Michigan in Ann Arbor. She was the first woman to enroll at the school following a decision by the Board of Regents to open the university to female students. The following semester, 34 additional female students, including Laura Rogers White and Olive San Louie Anderson, enrolled at the University of Michigan. Stockwell graduated from the university with a Bachelor of Arts degree in 1872, and was selected to deliver her class's commencement address, in which she stated that "There was never a time in which I did not long to attend our State University". Stockwell's speech was reportedly attended by future University of Michigan student Alice Freeman Palmer.

=== After graduation ===
In 1873, Stockwell married Charles K. Turner, who had been her classmate at the University of Michigan. Their wedding ceremony was officiated by University of Michigan professor Benjamin F. Cocker, who reportedly joked that their relationship proved "the ill effects of coeducation". Charles Turner died of tuberculosis in 1880 at the age of 37.

After her husband's death, Stockwell led a reclusive life.

== Death and legacy ==
Stockwell died in Kalamazoo, Michigan on June 7, 1924, at the age of 78. At the time, she was believed to have been the richest woman in the city.

In her will, Stockwell left $340,000 to Albion College, which the school used to build a library. The building was designated the Stockwell Memorial Library in her honor on June 4, 1938. She also left $10,000 to the University of Michigan. Members of Stockwell's family contested the will, but their claims were dismissed by the court.

Stockwell's diaries are kept at Albion College and were published in 1988 as A Michigan Childhood: The Journals of Madelon Louisa Stockwell, 1856–1860. In 1982, the Stockwell Society was established at Albion College to honor those who have included a gift to the school in their will.

Stockwell Hall, a residence hall at the University of Michigan, is named in her tribute.
