= Stockwell Hall =

Residence hall at the University of Michigan

Coordinates: 42.2788°N 83.7314°W

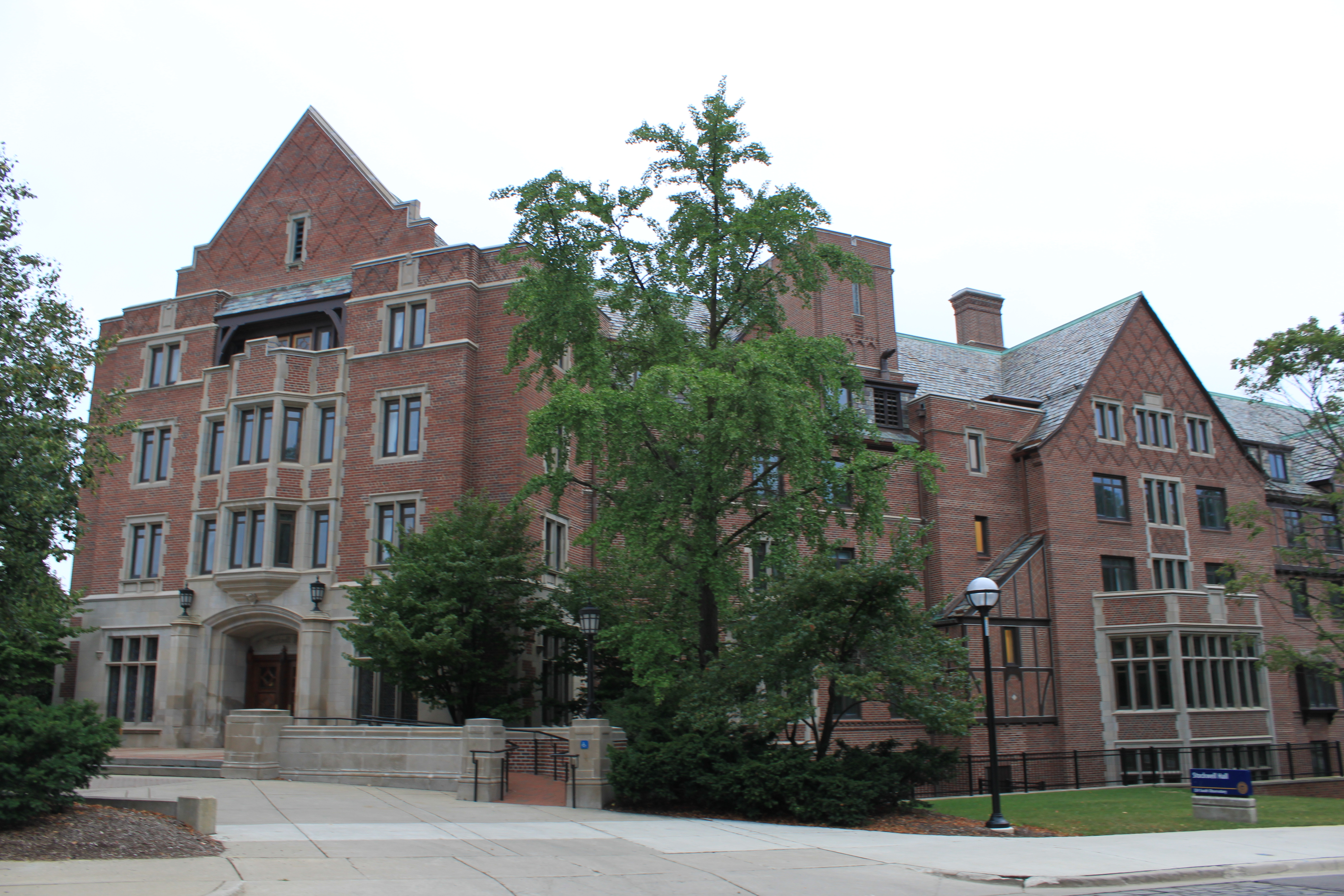
View from Observatory St.

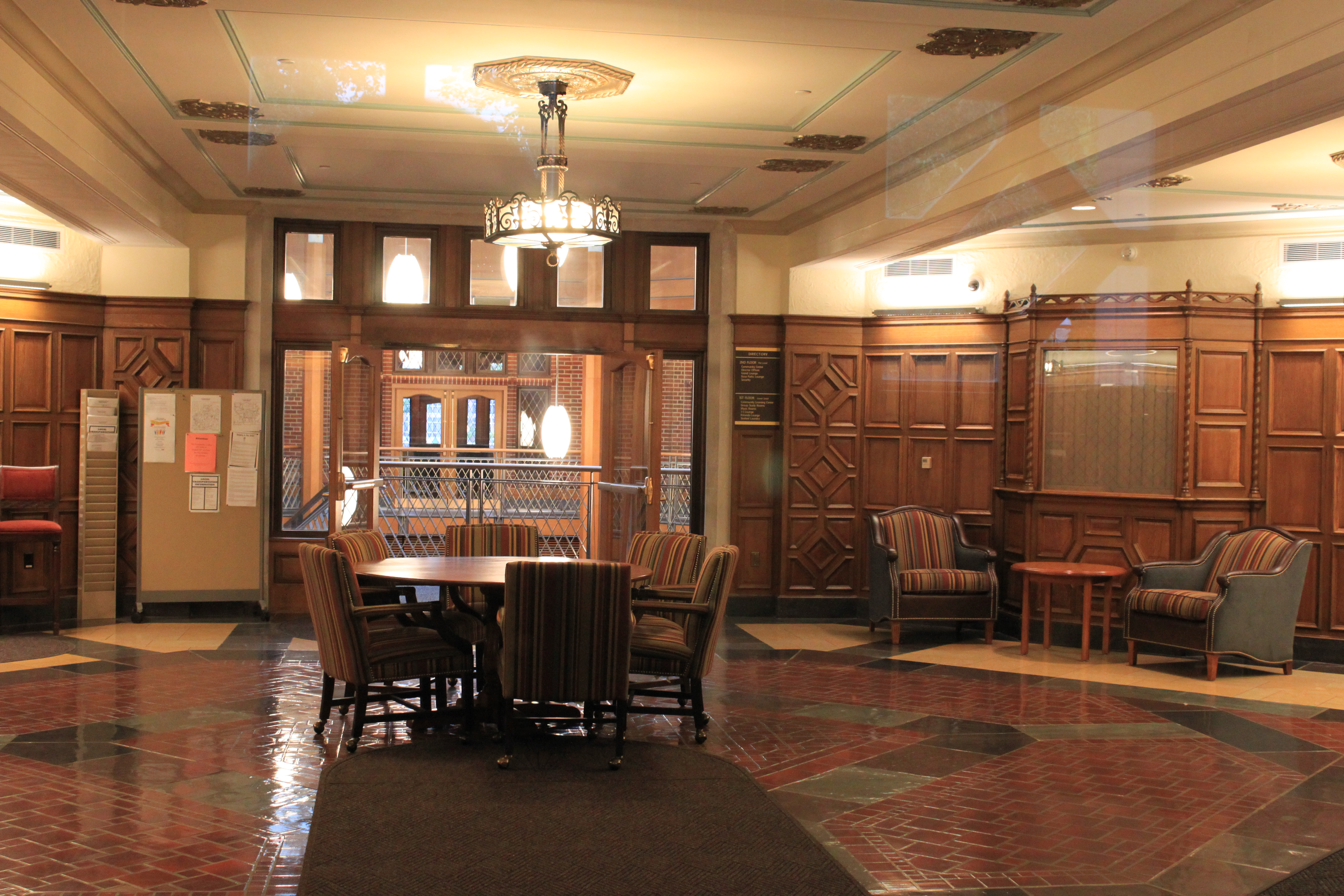
Lobby

Stockwell Hall, completed in 1940 at a cost of $1 million, is a formerly all-female (now coed) residence hall at the University of Michigan in Ann Arbor. It houses 418 predominantly second-year students. It was named after Madelon Louisa Stockwell of Kalamazoo, Michigan, the first woman admitted to the University in 1870.

Men were in residence for a single summer session in the early 1990s.

Stockwell was closed for the 2008/2009 school year for a $40 million renovation, which included upgraded bathrooms, plumbing, heating ventilation and air conditioning, wired and wireless internet access, and fire detection and sprinkler systems. The existing cafeteria was converted into new community spaces as the new marketplace style Hill Dining Center located next door currently serves the Hill community. It became a coed residence hall in fall 2009.

== Notable residents ==
- Judith Guest (`58, Education) - Author of Ordinary People
- Selma Blair (`95, LSA, Art & Design) - Actor, in the films Cruel Intentions and Legally Blonde
- Ann B. Davis (`48, Music, Theatre, and Dance) - Actor, best known for her role as "Alice" in the TV sitcom The Brady Bunch
