= Urban Valentine Williams Darlington =

Urban Valentine Williams Darlington (August 3, 1870 – 1954) was an American bishop of the Methodist Episcopal Church, South, elected in 1918.

Darlington was born in Shelby County, Kentucky, the son of James H. and Kitty (Pemberton) Darlington. Urban married Miss Lyda Clark of Millersburg, Kentucky, on October 30, 1901. Urban was educated in the common schools of his county. He then became an 1893 graduate of Kentucky Wesleyan College.

Rev. Darlington was Licensed to Preach in the M.E. Church, South August 16, 1890. He was admitted on trial to the Kentucky Annual Conference in 1896. He served the following appointments in Kentucky: Washington (four years), Millersburg (one year), and Scott Street Church, Covington (four years). Rev. Darlington then transferred to the West Virginia Annual Conference, serving these appointments: St. Paul's Church, Parkersburg (1905–09) and Johnson Memorial Church, Huntington (1909–1913). In 1913 he was appointed Presiding Elder of the Ashland District (until 1914). He was made Financial Agent of Morris Harvey College, Barboursville, West Virginia (1914–15), being elected President of the college in 1915, where he served until his election to the Episcopacy.

As a Bishop he served in Kentucky, West Virginia, Mississippi and in Europe (Belgium, Poland, and Czechoslovakia). He also served as the President of Kentucky Wesleyan College at Winchester, 1924–25.

He was inducted into the Kentucky Wesleyan College Alumni Hall of Fame in 2005.

== See also ==
- List of bishops of the United Methodist Church
