= John D. White =

American politician (1849–1920)

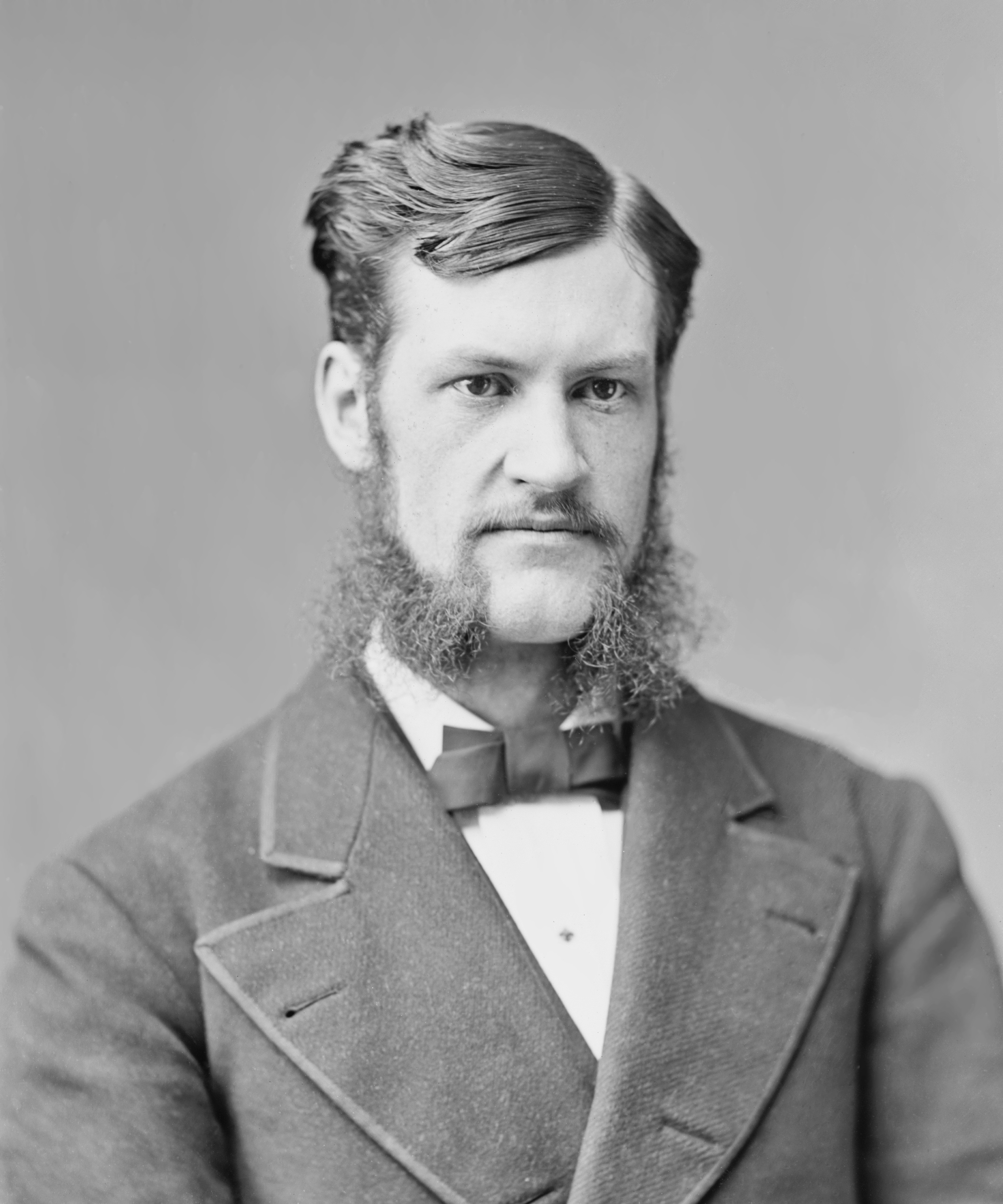

Member of the U.S. House of Representatives from Kentucky
- In office March 4, 1881 – March 3, 1885
- Preceded by: Thomas Turner
- Succeeded by: William P. Taulbee
- Constituency: 9th district (1881-83); 10th district (1883-85)
- In office March 4, 1875 – March 3, 1877
- Preceded by: George M. Adams
- Succeeded by: Thomas Turner
- Constituency: 9th district

Member of the Kentucky House of Representatives
- In office August 4, 1879 – March 3, 1881
- Preceded by: Isaac T. West
- Succeeded by: A. H. Clark
- Constituency: Clay, Jackson, and Owsley counties

Personal details
- Born: January 16, 1849 Clay County, Kentucky
- Died: January 5, 1920 (aged 70) Garrard, Kentucky
- Party: Republican
- Relations: John White (uncle); Samuel Wilber Hager (brother-in-law); Lawrence W. Hager (nephew)
- Education: University of Kentucky; University of Michigan
- Profession: Lawyer

John Daugherty White (January 16, 1849 – January 5, 1920) was an American politician who served as a U.S. representative from Kentucky. He was nephew of John White and cousin of Addison White and Hugh Lawson White both of whom served in public office.

== Biography ==
Born near Manchester in Clay County, Kentucky, one of six children of Daugherty White and Sarah Watts White. The Whites were a wealthy and politically influential family in Clay County, Kentucky, owning a saltworks and numerous land holdings, and were one side of the notorious Garrard-White Feud. White attended a private school until 1865 and Eminence (Kentucky) College and the University of Kentucky at Lexington until 1870. He was graduated from the law department of the University of Michigan at Ann Arbor in 1872. He also attended the medical department of the same institution. His sister, Laura Rogers White, was one of the first eight women graduated from the University of Michigan in 1874. He was admitted to the bar by the Kentucky Court of Appeals in 1875, and practiced law.

White was elected as a Republican to the Forty-fourth Congress (March 4, 1875 – March 3, 1877). He declined to be a candidate for renomination. He served as chairman of the Kentucky Republican State convention at Louisville in 1879. He served as member of the State house of representatives in 1879 and 1880. He resigned in 1880. He was endorsed and reelected without opposition during the sitting of the legislature. He served as delegate to the 1880 Republican National Convention. He was an unsuccessful Republican candidate for the United States Senate in 1881.

White was elected as a Republican to the Forty-seventh and Forty-eighth Congresses (March 4, 1881 – March 3, 1885). He declined to be a candidate for renomination in 1884 and resumed the practice of law in Louisville, Kentucky. He was an unsuccessful candidate of the State Prohibition Party for Governor of Kentucky in 1903. He was an unsuccessful candidate of the Progressive Party for judge of the Kentucky Court of Appeals in 1912. He died in Garrard, Kentucky on January 5, 1920. He was interred in the family burying ground near Manchester, Kentucky.

U.S. House of Representatives
Preceded by George M. Adams	Member of the U.S. House of Representatives from Kentucky's 9th congressional district 1875 – 1877	Succeeded by Thomas Turner
Preceded by Thomas Turner	Member of the U.S. House of Representatives from Kentucky's 9th congressional district 1881 – 1883	Succeeded by William Culbertson
Preceded by Elijah Phister	Member of the U.S. House of Representatives from Kentucky's 10th congressional district 1883 – 1885	Succeeded by William P. Taulbee
