= Henry M. Bosworth =

American politician (1860–1942)

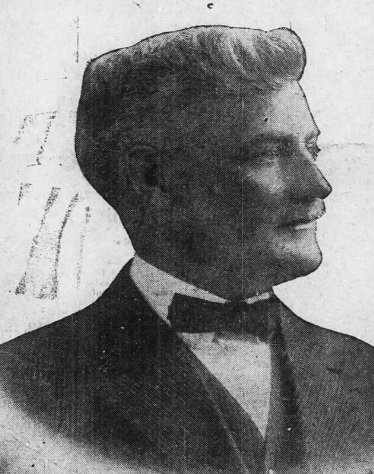
- Bosworth in 1915

20th Kentucky Auditor of Public Accounts
- In office 1912–1916
- Governor: James B. McCreary
- Preceded by: Frank P. Jones
- Succeeded by: Robert L. Greene

15th Kentucky State Treasurer
- In office 1904–1908
- Governor: J.C.W. Beckham
- Preceded by: Samuel Wilber Hager
- Succeeded by: Edwin Farley

Sheriff of Fayette County, Kentucky
- In office 1900–1904

Personal details
- Born: March 12, 1860
- Died: August 25, 1942 (aged 82) Lexington, Kentucky, U.S.
- Resting place: Lexington Cemetery
- Party: Democratic
- Spouse: Olive Fant (m. 1909)
- Relations: Joseph Bosworth (brother)
- Parent(s): Benjamin Bosworth; Mary Cloud
- Education: University of Kentucky

Henry M. Bosworth (March 12, 1860 – August 25, 1942) was an American politician who served as Kentucky Auditor of Public Accounts from 1912 to 1916, Kentucky State Treasurer from 1904 to 1908, and Sheriff of Fayette County, Kentucky from 1900 to 1904. He was also a horse breeder, and bred purebred horses for many years. He was a member of the Democratic Party.

== Biography ==
Henry M. Bosworth was born on March 12, 1860, to Benjamin Bosworth and Mary Cloud. He was educated in the private schools of Lexington, Kentucky, and afterward attended the University of Kentucky. He married Olive Fant on June 3, 1909, they had no children.

After university, Bosworth began a career in agriculture, breeding purebred horses, and raising trotting horses. In 1899, he was elected sheriff of Fayette County, Kentucky. On January 30, 1900, governor William Goebel was shot in Frankfort. Goebel's assassins, John W. Davis and Caleb Powers, were arrested by Bosworth on a train as they were being transported from Frankfort under the protection of soldiers. Bosworth served as sheriff until 1904.

In 1903, Bosworth was the Democratic Party's nominee for Kentucky State Treasurer. His opponent was John A. Black, a Republican. Bosworth won the election taking 222,790 votes to Blacks 198,178 votes. He served until 1908.

In 1907, Bosworth ran for Kentucky Auditor of Public Accounts, but lost to Frank P. Jones in the general election.

In 1911, Bosworth ran for Kentucky Auditor of Public Accounts. He won the Democratic primary over challenger Ruby Laffoon, taking 1,727 votes to Laffoon's 1,292 votes. Bosworth advanced to the general election and defeated his Republican challenger Leonard W. Bethurum. Bosworth served as auditor during a time where it was nearly equal to the governor. He served as auditor until 1916.

In 1915, Bosworth ran for governor of Kentucky, but withdrew before the primary was held.

Bosworth died on the night of August 25, 1942, at the Good Samaritan Hospital in Lexington, Kentucky. He was 82 years old. He was buried in the Lexington Cemetery.
