= WKWC =

- Owensboro, Kentucky; United States
- Broadcast area: Owensboro
- Frequency: 90.3 MHz
- Branding: Panther Radio

Programming
- Format: Album Adult Alternative

Ownership
- Owner: Kentucky Wesleyan College

History
- First air date: January 21, 1983

Technical information
- Licensing authority: FCC
- Facility ID: 34259
- Class: A
- ERP: 5,000 watts
- HAAT: 25.0 meters
- Transmitter coordinates: 37°44′32″N 87°07′27″W

Links
- Public license information: Public file; LMS
- Webcast: http://www.wkwc.org

WKWC (90.3 FM) is a radio station broadcasting an Album Adult Alternative (or Triple A) format. Licensed to Owensboro, Kentucky, United States, the station serves the Owensboro area. The station is currently owned by Kentucky Wesleyan College.
