= Joseph Bosworth (politician) =

American lawyer, businessman, and politician (1866–1941)

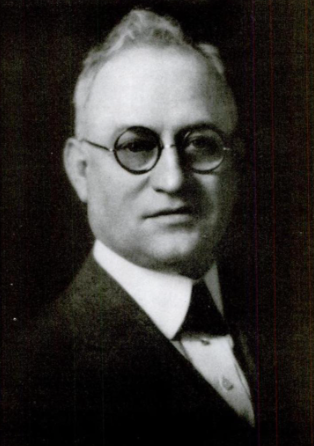
- Joseph F. Bosworth

65th Speaker of the Kentucky House of Representatives
- In office 1920–1922
- Preceded by: Robert C. Crowe
- Succeeded by: James H. Thompson

Member of the Kentucky House of Representatives from the 84th district
- In office January 1, 1920 – January 1, 1926
- Preceded by: James T. Thornton (redistricting)
- Succeeded by: Matt G. Slusher

Member of the Kentucky Senate from the 17th district
- In office January 1, 1908 – January 1, 1916
- Preceded by: George W. Shadoan
- Succeeded by: Benoni C. Lewis

Member of the Kentucky House of Representatives from the 93rd district
- In office January 1, 1906 – January 1, 1908
- Preceded by: Chad Nolan
- Succeeded by: Denver B. Cornett

Personal details
- Born: October 3, 1866 Fayette County, Kentucky, U.S.
- Died: April 26, 1941 (aged 74) Middlesboro, Kentucky, U.S.
- Resting place: Middlesboro Cemetery
- Party: Republican
- Spouse: Elizabeth Veal (m. 1890)
- Relations: Henry M. Bosworth, (brother)
- Children: 2
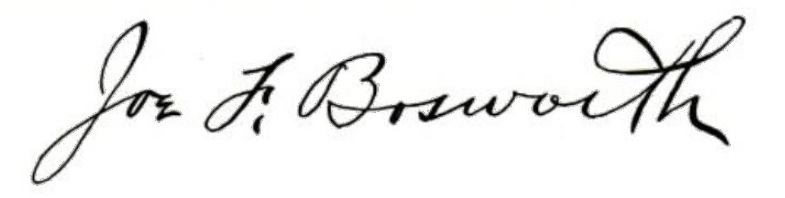
- Signature

Joseph F. Bosworth (October 3, 1866 – April 26, 1941) was an American lawyer, businessman, and politician who served several terms as a member of both chambers of the Kentucky General Assembly as a member of the Kentucky House of Representatives and the Kentucky Senate. A Republican, he was elected speaker of the Kentucky House of Representatives in 1920 and served until 1921. He was the last Republican speaker until the election of Jeff Hoover in 2017.

== Early life and education ==
Joseph F. Bosworth was born on October 3, 1866, in Fayette County, Kentucky, to Benjamin Bosworth and Mary Cloud. He grew up on his father's farm and received his early education from a rural school taught by novelist James Lane Allen. For three years, he attended the University of Kentucky in Lexington, and then enrolled in the University of Virginia, where he studied law. He married Elizabeth Veal in 1890, in Tazewell, Tennessee, and they had two children, Joseph F. Jr., and Eleanora.

== Career ==
After graduating, Bosworth began studying as an apprentice under Joe D. Hunt, a lawyer from Lexington. In 1889, Bosworth was admitted to the bar. Afterward, he traveled to Omaha, Nebraska, where he stayed for a short time. In September 1889, he settled in Middlesboro, Kentucky, where, for about ten years, he maintained a successful law practice.

Throughout his career, Bosworth maintained several business endeavors in both Kentucky and Tennessee. He served as director of the Yellow Creek Coal Company, which operated in Bell County, Kentucky. He served as vice-president and director of the Mingo Coal and Coke Company. The company owned and operated several coal mines in Claiborne County, Tennessee, and produced over 800 tons of coal a day. Bosworth also served as director of the Middlesboro Coal Land Owning and Leasing Company, which owned over 5,000 acres (20 km^{2}) of land in Bell County.

=== Political career ===
Bosworth's political career started in 1890 when he was elected to serve on the Middlesboro city council for two years. In 1893, he was elected judge of Middlesboro. He was re-elected as judge in 1897 and served until 1902, when he was elected city attorney, a position he held until 1903.

In 1905, Bosworth was elected Kentucky state representative for the 93rd district, which comprised Bell, Harlan, Leslie, and Perry counties. He served until 1908. In 1907, was elected state senator for the 17th district, which comprised Bell, Jackson, Knox, Laurel, Pulaski, and Rockcastle counties. He was re-elected as state senator in 1911 and served until 1916.

In 1919, Bosworth was again elected to the Kentucky House of Representatives, representing the 84th district, which consisted of Bell County. This same election cycle, Republicans won a majority in the state house and his peers chose Bosworth to be speaker, the second Republican to hold the office. He served as speaker between 1920 and 1922 when the Republicans lost their majority. He was the last Republican speaker until the election of Jeff Hoover in 2017. Bosworth served as a representative until 1940.

During his time in office, Bosworth made several modifications to the constitution of Kentucky. From 1908 to 1916, he introduced several amendments to improve the quality of roads within the state, earning him the nickname "The Father of Good Roads". The reforms permitted the state to loan its funds and credit to supplement the undertaking of road districts and the building of highways. He also helped Middlesboro become a third-class city (a city with a population between 8,000 and 19,999) instead of a fourth-class city (a city with a population between 3,000 and 7,999), thus allowing it to have a circuit court. Bosworth helped secure a law allowing all third-class cities to maintain a city commission government. He helped passed a bill creating the 33rd and 34th judicial districts. Other bills pioneered by Bosworth include the Kentucky Pure Food and Drug Law, which required corporations to properly label food, drug, and liquor products, and the appropriation law, which completed the current Kentucky State Capitol Building.

== Later life and death ==
Bosworth left office in 1940. He died on April 26, 1941, at the age of 74 in Middlesboro, Kentucky, after a short illness. Before he died, he filed to run for mayor of Middlesboro. He was buried in the Middlesboro Cemetery in Middlesboro.
