= Samuel Wilber Hager =

American politician (1858–1918)

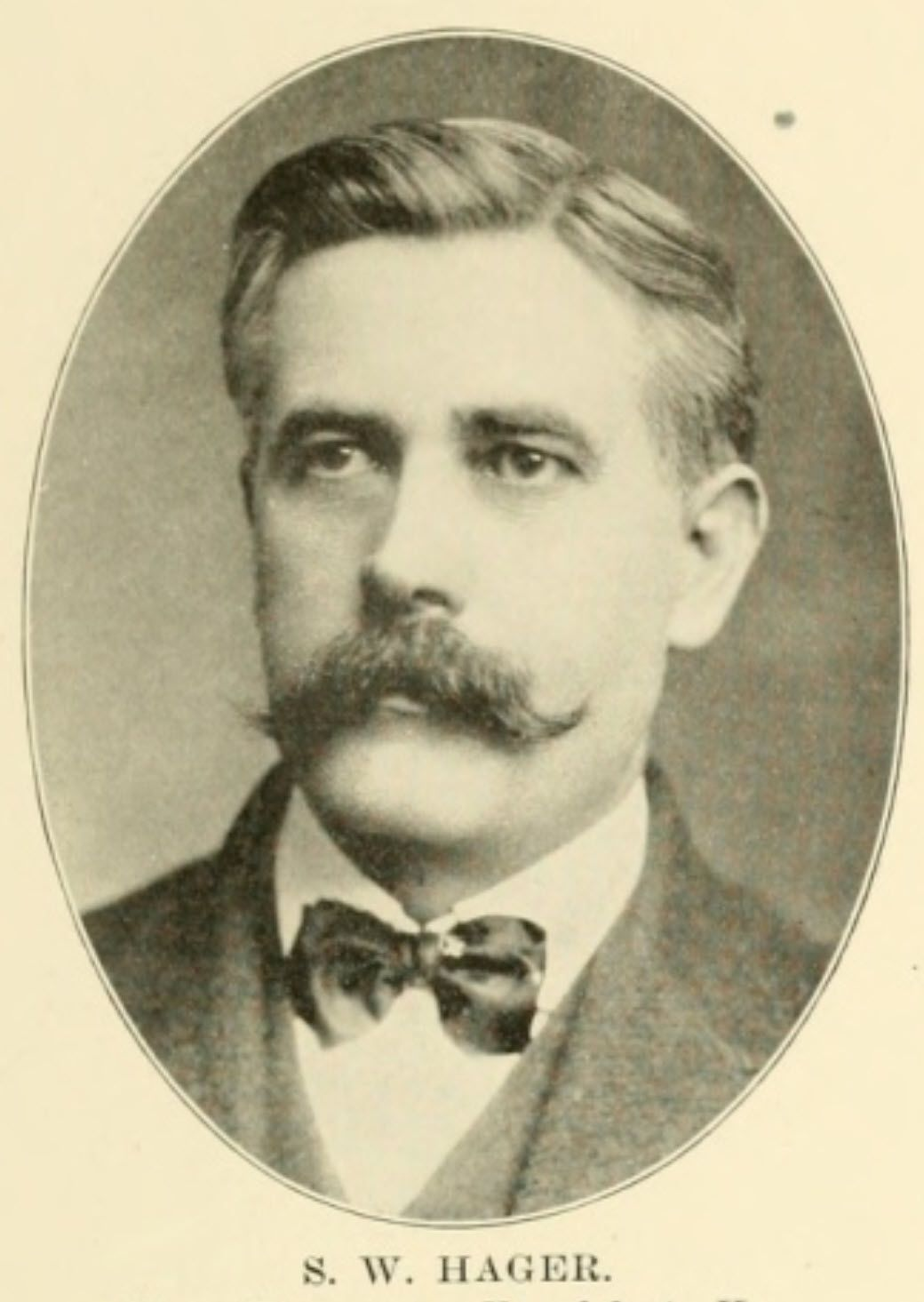

19th Kentucky Auditor of Public Accounts
- In office 1904–1908
- Governor: J. C. W. Beckham; Augustus E. Willson
- Preceded by: Gus G. Coulter
- Succeeded by: Frank P. Jones

14th Kentucky State Treasurer
- In office 1900–1904
- Governor: William Goebel; J. C. W. Beckham
- Preceded by: Walter R. Day
- Succeeded by: Henry M. Bosworth

Personal details
- Born: December 19, 1858 Gallia County, Ohio, U.S.
- Died: December 27, 1918 (aged 60) Owensboro, Kentucky, U.S.
- Resting place: Ashland Cemetery
- Party: Democratic
- Spouse: Elizabeth Woods White (m. 1885)
- Children: 2
- Education: University of Kentucky

Samuel Wilber Hager (December 19, 1858 – December 27, 1918) was an American politician who served as the 14th Kentucky State Treasurer from 1900 to 1904, and Kentucky State Auditor from 1904 to 1908. He was the Democratic party's nominee for governor of Kentucky in 1907, but lost the race. He subsequently owned a newspaper while remaining involved in politics. Hager died in 1918.

== Early life and education ==
Samuel Wilber Hager was born to William James and Phoebe Ann Hager on December 19, 1858. The Hagers were farmers near the village of Gallipolis in Gallia County, Ohio. As a child, his parents moved their family to Salyersville, Kentucky, where his father found work in the lumber business. Hager's education was unexceptional and he became a schoolteacher. With financial aid from his father, he was able to enroll in the University of Kentucky. After graduating from the University of Kentucky, he and a brother became engaged in mercantile work. On June 30, 1885, he married Elizabeth Woods White, sister of John D. White, a Kentucky congressman. He and Elizabeth had two sons, Lawrence W. and William Bruce Hager.

== Career ==
Hager moved to Ashland, Kentucky in 1887, where he became an associate attorney alongside his uncle. He began his political career in 1896, when he was elected Judge/Executive of Boyd County, Kentucky. In 1899, he was elected Kentucky State Treasurer, an office that he held from 1900 to 1904. He was elected Kentucky State Auditor in 1903, and assumed office in 1904, he held the position until 1908.

=== 1907 gubernatorial election ===
Democratic governor J. C. W. Beckham used his clout to support the selection of Hager as the party's nominee for governor. Hager easily won the primary election over challenger N.B. Hays and went on to face Louisville attorney Augustus E. Willson as his Republican opponent.

Both Hager and Willson believed in the enactment of a county level regional choice law on temperance. The major campaign issue was the ongoing Black Patch Tobacco Wars in western Kentucky. Willson had twice represented the American Tobacco Company as their attorney. Farmers in western Kentucky had resisted their monopoly on tobacco prices and were trying to express their own power through the Planters' Protective Association (PPA); but they had begun to use violence against farmers who would not join the association. Democrats used this to attack Willson, and Willson did little to counter accusations that he was unsympathetic to the plight of the farmers. Willson then counterattacked, claiming that the tobacco company had contributed US$15,000 towards Hagers 1903 state auditor campaign.

The prevailing theme of Willson's campaign was public morality. The Willson campaign condemned Hager as representing the political machine. Hager carried the stigma of being the hand-picked candidate of Governor Beckham, whose tenure had resulted in unpopularity due to inaction in the face of the violence during his administration. This tactic proved effective in tarnishing Hager's reputation, and rural Democrats were reluctant to vote for Hager, instead casting their votes for Willson. A disagreement between Hager and an associate of Governor Beckham caused Hager's support to wane. Willson ended up defeating Hager, taking 214,478 votes (51.17%) to Hager's 196,428 votes (46.87%). Strong support from urban areas such as Jefferson County swung the election for Willson.

== Later life and death ==
Hager purchased the Owensboro Inquirer (now called the Messenger-Inquirer) in 1909. He would continue to manage and issue the newspaper until his death. In 1915, he was deeply involved in Augustus O. Stanley's campaign for governor. Stanley won the election by 471 votes, and shortly after being inaugurated appointed Hager to the Kentucky Workmen's Compensation Board. Hager would serve as a member of the board until his death.

While in Frankfort, Hager suddenly became ill, and after a short break, he returned to his role on the Kentucky Workmen's Compensation Board. His physician advised him that it would be best for his health if he traveled to Battle Creek, Michigan, where he stayed for a short period. After he returned to Owensboro, he traveled to Louisville, Kentucky to seek the advice of Curran Pope, a doctor in Louisville. After his return to Owensboro, it became clear that his condition would not improve. Hager died at his home in Owensboro on December 27, 1918, at the age of 60. He was interred at Ashland Cemetery in Ashland, Kentucky.

== Electoral history ==
1907 Kentucky gubernatorial election
Party	Candidate	Votes	%
Republican	Augustus E. Willson	214,478	51.17%
Democratic	Samuel Wilber Hager	196,428	46.87%
Prohibition	L. L. Pickett	6,352	1.52%
Socialist	Claude Andrews	1,499	0.36%
Socialist Labor	James H. Harold	381	0.09%

Party political offices
Preceded by J. C. W. Beckham	Democratic nominee for Governor of Kentucky; 1907	Succeeded by James B. McCreary
Political offices
Preceded by Walter R. Day	Kentucky State Treasurer; 1900–1904	Succeeded by Henry M. Bosworth
Preceded by Gus G. Coulter	Kentucky State Auditor; 1904–1908	Succeeded by Frank P. Jones
