= Kentucky League of Cities =

The Kentucky League of Cities (founded 1927 as the Kentucky Municipal League) is a voluntary league of cities in Kentucky. Its mission is to serve "as the united voice of cities by supporting community innovation, effective leadership and quality governance." It is a member of the National League of Cities and operates from Lexington, Kentucky. The president of the organization is usually succeeded by its vice president.

== Presidents ==
- 1929–1931: Dr. C. T. Coleman, Mayor of Frankfort
- 1933–1934: Paul Morton, City Manager of Lexington
- 1934–1935: Edgar Hager, Mayor of Ashland
- 1935–1936: Edward G. Scott, Mayor of Paducah
- 2017–2018: Jim Barnes, Mayor of Richmond

== See also ==
- List of state Municipal Leagues
