= 1907 Kentucky gubernatorial election =

- November 5, 1907
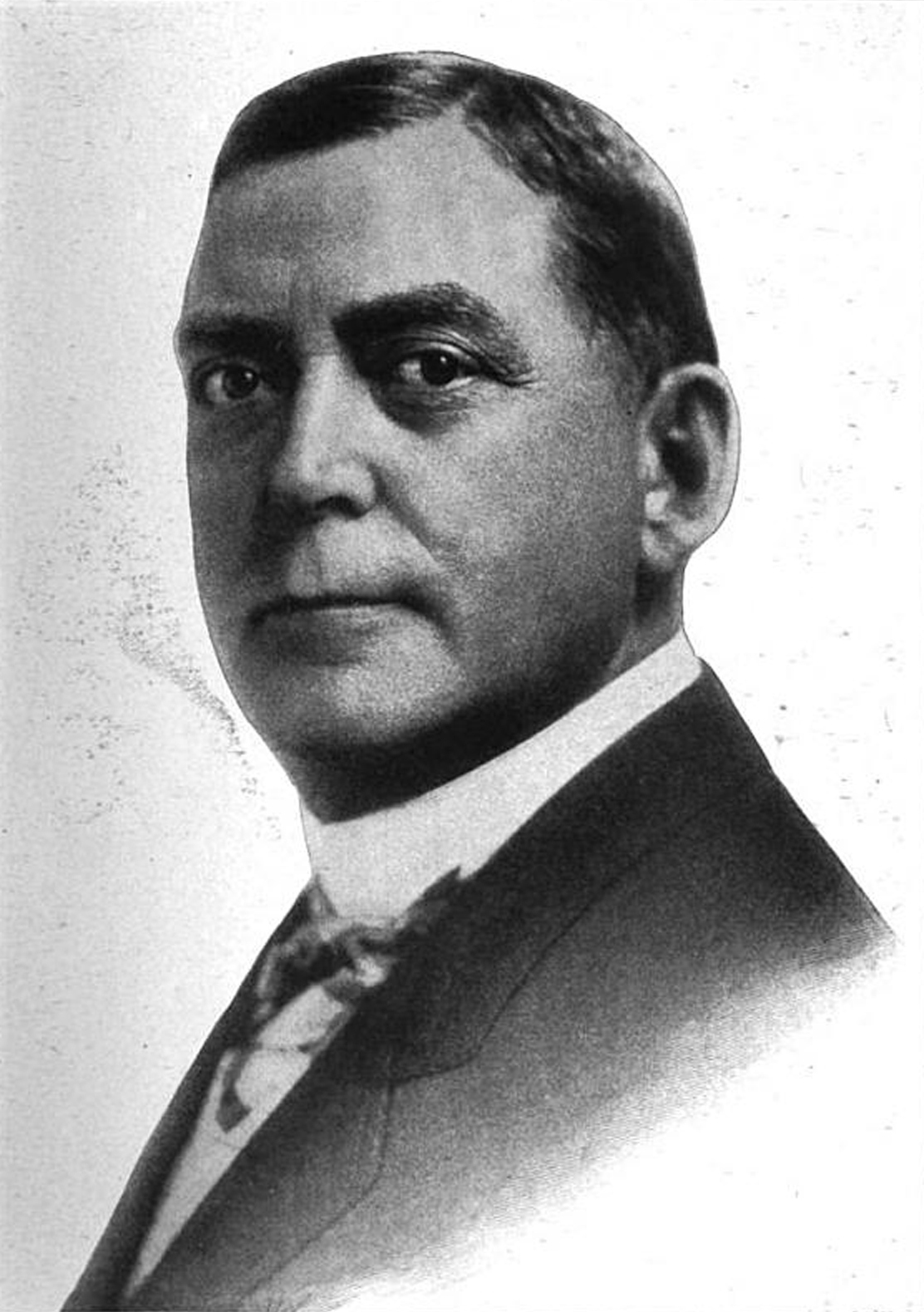

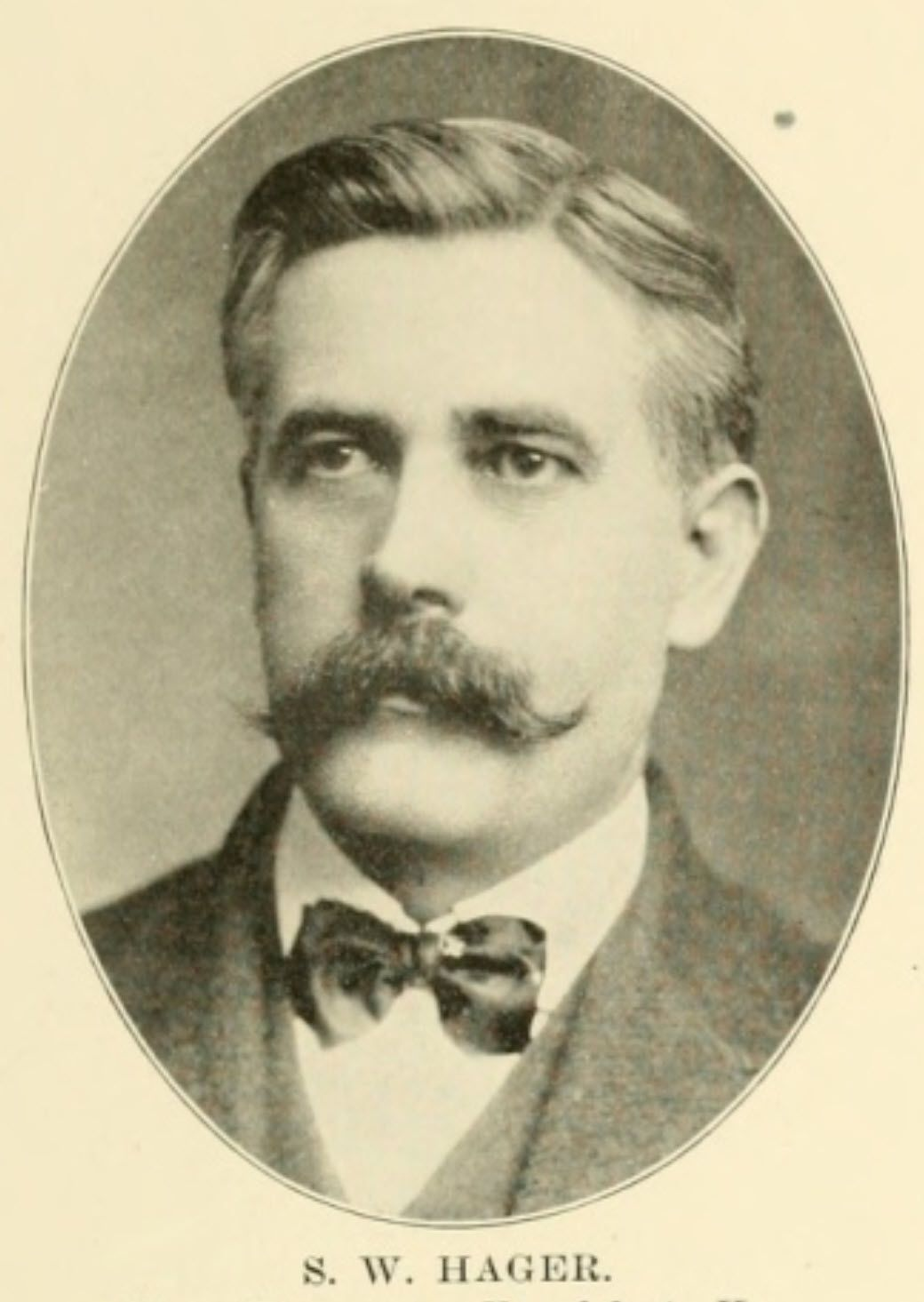
Nominee	Augustus E. Willson	Samuel Wilber Hager
Party	Republican	Democratic
Popular vote	214,478	196,428
Percentage	51.17%	46.87%
- Wilson: 40–50% 50–60% 60–70% 70–80% 80–90% >90% Hager: 40–50% 50–60% 60–70% 70–80%
Governor before election
J. C. W. Beckham
Democratic
Elected Governor
Augustus E. Willson
Republican

The 1907 Kentucky gubernatorial election was held on November 5, 1907. Republican nominee Augustus E. Willson defeated Democratic nominee Samuel Wilber Hager with 51.17% of the vote.

== General election ==
=== Candidates ===
Major party candidates

- Augustus E. Willson, Republican
- Samuel Wilber Hager, Democratic

Other candidates

- L. L. Pickett, Prohibition
- Claude Andrews, Socialist
- James H. Arnold, Socialist Labor

=== Results ===
1907 Kentucky gubernatorial election
Party	Candidate	Votes	%	±%
Republican	Augustus E. Willson	214,478	51.17%	+5.00%
Democratic	Samuel Wilber Hager	196,428	46.87%	−5.25%
Prohibition	L. L. Pickett	6,352	1.52%	+0.42%
Socialist	Claude Andrews	1,499	0.36%	+0.22%
Socialist Labor	James H. Arnold	381	0.09%	−0.38%
Majority		18,050	4.30%	
Turnout				
Republican gain from Democratic		Swing		
