= Laura Rogers White =

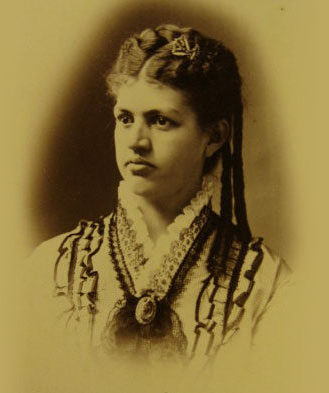
- Born: December 11, 1852
- Died: January 25, 1929 (aged 76)
- Alma mater: University of Michigan; Massachusetts Institute of Technology
- Occupation: Architect, suffragist
- Relatives: John D. White

Laura Rogers White (December 11, 1852 – January 25, 1929) was the first woman to graduate from the University of Michigan with a bachelor of science degree. She studied to be an architect but largely did not practice due to family obligations and lack of opportunities for female professionals.

== Early life ==
Laura Rogers White was born near Manchester, Kentucky, on December 11, 1852, one of six children of Daugherty White and Sarah Watts White. The Whites were a wealthy and politically influential family in Clay County, Kentucky, owning a saltworks and numerous land holdings, and were one side of the notorious Garrard-White Feud. Her brother John Daughterty White served in the US House of Representatives.

White attended the Science Hill Female Academy, then enrolled at the University of Michigan in 1871, where her brother studied law. In 1870, Madelon Stockwell became the first woman to attend the university, and White was a small group of women who followed her example the next year. White spent one year of graduate school at MIT (Massachusetts Institute of Technology) and nearly one year of graduate school at l'Ecole Special d'Architecture in Paris, France, studying architecture at both schools. Michigan students gave her the nickname "Alba Longa" because of her height of 6'2". She excelled in mathematics and graduated with honors in 1874.

White said of her time at Michigan:

I expected to be a teacher of mathematics, or possibly an architect, and prepared for that. My father’s death made that not best for the family, so to be with my mother and do best for my sisters, I relinquished those ambitions. But my college course has helped me to help others in many ways, and…has broadened my views and given me the power to enjoy the best in literature and art.

She taught for a year in Lexington, Kentucky, but returned to Manchester in 1875 following the death of her father, to help settle his estate and care for younger siblings. She then studied architecture at the Massachusetts Institute of Technology and the Sorbonne. For two years, she worked as a draughtsman for the Office of the Supervisory Architect of the U. S. Treasury Department in Washington D. C. and briefly opened her own office as an architect in the city. However, she soon permanently returned to Kentucky, teaching from home and managing the family salt business.

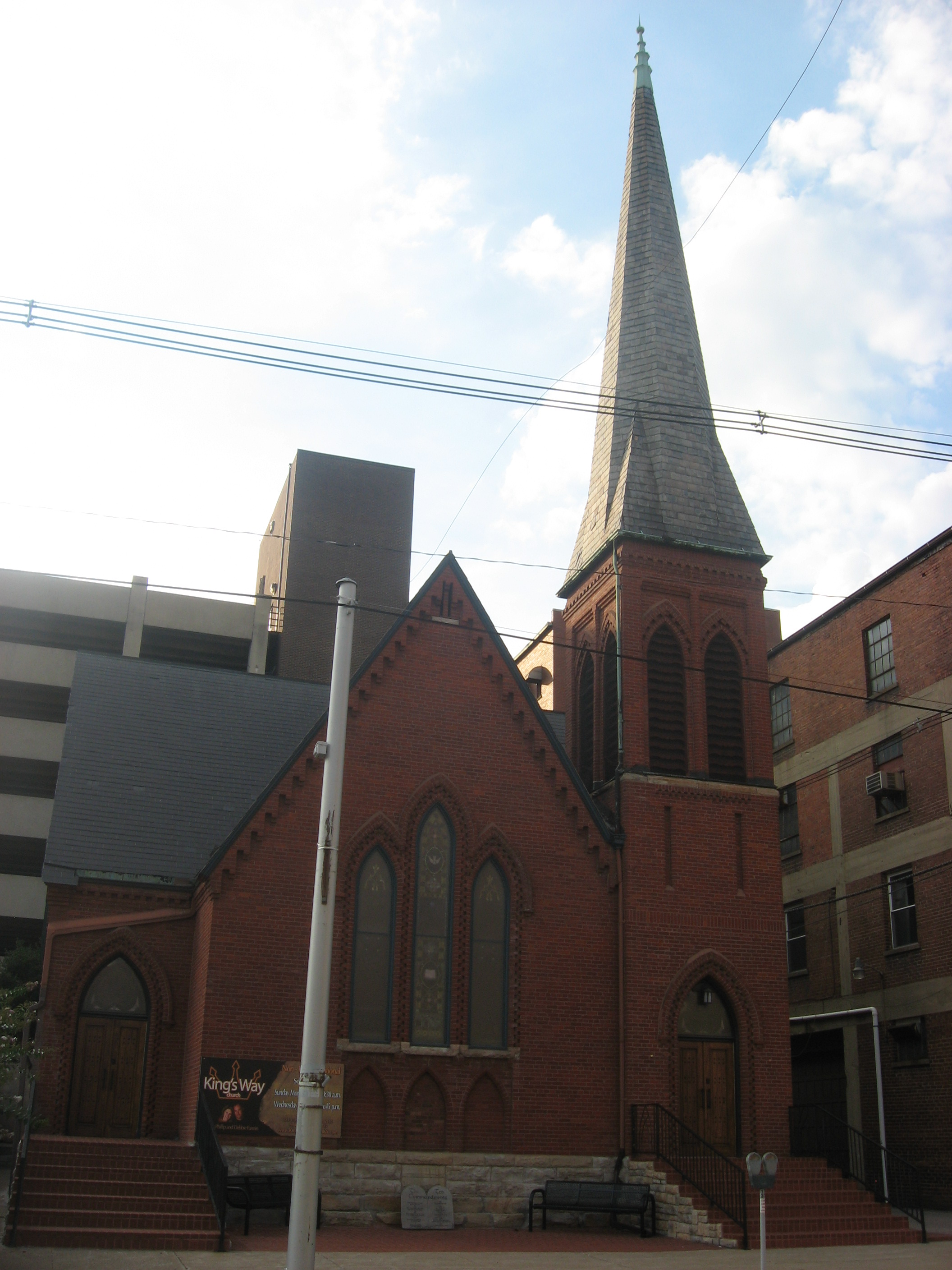
First Christian Church of Ashland

At the turn of the 20th century, there were only two women working as architects in Kentucky, and White is known to have designed only a single building, completed in 1890: the First Christian Church in Ashland, Kentucky, currently on the National Register of Historic Places.

In the 1910s, she was active in civic causes and organizations, including both the Outdoor Art League of Louisville, and the Women's Peace Party Convention. White was the director of the Huntington branch of KERA (Kentucky Equal Rights Association). Laura Rogers White was one of very few suffragists in the state of Kentucky at the time.

On January 25,1929, White died of a heart condition at her sister's home in Owensboro, Kentucky.
