= List of people from Ashland, Kentucky =

This is a list of people who were born in, lived in, or are closely associated with the city of Ashland, Kentucky.

== List ==
=== Athletics ===
- Chris Jennings, running back for NFL's Cleveland Browns
- Charlie Reliford, Major League Baseball umpire
- Jay Rhodemyre, former NFL center
- Don Robinson, former Major League Baseball pitcher
- Robert Smedley, professional wrestler for World Championship Wrestling and World Wrestling Entertainment as Bobby Blaze
- Brandon Webb, pitcher for Major League Baseball's Arizona Diamondbacks, 2006 National League Cy Young Award winner

=== Arts and entertainment ===
- Noah Adams, broadcast journalist and author
- Allison Anders, filmmaker and director
- Billy Ray Cyrus, country music singer, born and raised in Flatwoods, Kentucky, just outside Ashland
- Trace Cyrus, musician
- Mark Fosson, musician/songwriter
- Leigh French, actress
- Jillian Hall, WWE Diva
- Mabel Hite, vaudeville and musical comedy performer
- Naomi Judd, country music singer, The Judds
- Wynonna Judd, country music singer, The Judds
- Steve Kazee, Broadway and film actor
- Sonny Landham, actor and former Kentucky gubernatorial candidate
- Michele Mahone, entertainment reporter, NINE Network, Australia
- Venus Ramey, first red-haired Miss America in 1944
- Julie Reeves, country music singer
- Jean Bell Thomas, proprietress of American Folk Song Festival in Ashland area 1930 - 1972
- Alberta Vaughn, actress
- Keith Whitley, country music singer
- Chuck Woolery, game show host

=== Education, politics, and service ===
- Claria Horn Boom, U.S. federal judge
- William Wirt Culbertson, former politician
- Paul Fannin, politician, 11th Governor of Arizona
- John Means, former mayor of Ashland and businessman
- William Worth Patterson, former mayor of Ashland and businessman

== See also ==
- List of mayors of Ashland, Kentucky
