= Gartrell =

Gartrell is a surname and, less often, a given name. Notable people with the name include:

== Surname ==
- Amy Gartrell (born 1974), American artist
- Charles H. Gartrell (1914–1988), American state and municipal officer from Ashland, Kentucky
- Frederick Gartrell (1914–1987), Anglican priest in the second half of the 20th century
- Herbert William Gartrell (1882–1945), South Australian professor of mining and metallurgy
- James Gartrell, founding partner of G. Wood, Son & Co. in Adelaide in 1876
- Lucius Jeremiah Gartrell (1821–1891), American politician and lawyer, general in the Confederate States Army
- Nanette Gartrell, MD, American psychiatrist, researcher, lesbian activist and writer
- Robert Gartrell (born 1962), Australian cricketer
- Stacey Gartrell (born 1977), freestyle long-distance swimmer from Australia
- Tharin Gartrell, American allegedly involved in a 2008 Barack Obama assassination plot
- Tim Gartrell (born 1970), Secretary of the Australian Labor Party

== Given name ==
- Gartrell Johnson (born 1986), American football running back

== See also ==
- Gartrell v. Stafford, 12 Neb. 545, 11 N.W. 732 (1882) is a frequently cited 1882 decision of the Nebraska Supreme Court
- Gartel
