= Charles Weaver =

Charles Weaver may refer to:

- Charles A. Weaver (1845–1906), American businessman
- Charles P. Weaver (1851–1932), American politician, mayor of Louisville, Kentucky
- Charles Weaver (Australian politician) (1817–1874), New South Wales politician
- Charlie Weaver (politician) (born 1957), Minnesota politician
- Charles Yardley Weaver (1884–1930), Alberta politician
- Charlie Weaver (born 1949), American football player
- Charley Weaver, comic alter-ego of Cliff Arquette, American actor and comedian
- Charles F. Weaver (c. 1858–1932), mayor of Ashland, Kentucky
- Buck Weaver (American football) (Charles Austin Weaver, 1905–1967), American football player

== See also ==
- Chuck Weaver (born 1956), member of the Illinois Senate
