= Agudas Achim =

Agudas Achim or Agudath Achim (Hebrew: אֲגוּדַת אַחִים Agudat Aḥim; "Association of Brothers") is the name of several synagogues.

== United States ==
- Agudas Achim Congregation (Coralville, Iowa)
- Congregation Agudas Achim Anshei Sfard (Newton, Massachusetts), commonly known as The Adams Street Shul
- Congregation Agudath Achim Anshai (Freehold, New Jersey), commonly known as the Freehold Jewish Center
- Congregation Agudas Achim (Livingston Manor, New York)
- Congregation Agudas Achim (Bexley, Ohio)
- Congregation Agudas Achim (Austin, Texas)
- Agudas Achim Congregation (Alexandria, Virginia)

=== Former synagogues ===
- Congregation Agudath Achim (Ashland, Kentucky), closed in 1986
