= History of Ashland, Kentucky =

Ashland is a city in north-eastern Kentucky. Prior to European colonization, it was home to the Adena culture, Hopewell culture, Armstrong culture, and Fort Ancient Native American groups, and later the Shawnee. European settlement by Scots-Irish Americans began in 1783. In 1800, iron deposits were discovered in Ashland, which would lead to an influx of industry over the next two centuries. In the 21st century, city growth has spilled into neighboring areas, technically outside of city-limits, and the industrial economy has shrunk alongside expansions in the services sector.

In 2006, Ashland was home to a sexual assault scandal in which more than a dozen officers were accused of having sex with a detainee while on duty.

== Prehistory ==
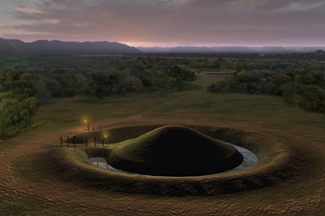
The Biggs site in South Shore

The present-day area of Ashland was originally inhabited by Native Americans migrating southeast from Beringia, although their earliest dating remains controversial.

During the Woodland period, the Adena culture left large earthworks downriver at South Shore's Biggs site (c. 800 BC to 0). The Hopewell who succeeded them then expanded the complex into the great Portsmouth Earthworks (c. AD 0 to 500). Ashland lies between this group and the related but distinct Armstrong culture who lived along the Big Sandy. Its Central Park includes six 4- to 5-foot (1.2 to 1.5 m) burial mounds, which have been placed on the National Register of Historic Places. They have not been excavated by archaeologists, but are thought to date to the Adena period. The mounds within the city used to be more numerous but were mostly destroyed in its construction. The present mounds are actually restorations, having been rebuilt from smaller heaps; The city recently agreed to fence them.

The Hopewell and Armstrong were succeeded c. 1000 by the Fort Ancient culture. The group closest to Ashland was the Feurt Focus, which developed into the Shawnee. The largest community nearby at the time of European exploration seems to have been Lower Shawneetown near South Portsmouth.

== Founding and early history ==
=== Poage Settlement ===
Ashland, first known as "Poage Settlement" and "Poage's Landing", was settled by at least two related groups of the Poage family of Virginia. Robert Poage and his sons Robert Jr., and George, along with Major George Poage and his son John, held title to thousands of acres obtained by assignment from the William Bell patent and treasury land warrants. The first recorded land grant in the area was made to General James Wilkinson in 1783, from whom Robert Poage purchased a 5,000-acre (20 km^{2}) grant.

The first brick home built in Poage Settlement.

The Poages were of Scots-Irish stock, some coming to Kentucky directly from Virginia through the Cumberland Gap in 1786 and some from Virginia by way of Harrodsburg and Mayslick. They took farmlands on the Ohio River bottoms between the mouths of Keys Creek and Hoods Creek and operated a water-powered sawmill near the mouth of Hoods Creek, perhaps as early as 1799. The Poage settlement remained an extended-family community until the mid-19th century.

In 1800, Richard Deering, a farmer on the Little Sandy River in what is now the adjoining county of Greenup, made a discovery that made a tremendous impact on the area's development. While engaged in the process of boiling down salt for farm uses, Deering discovered high grade iron ore deposits on his property.

In 1815, he built a small cupola to produce farm and kitchen implements. Business grew, and in 1818, Deering, along with David and John Trimble, built Argillite Furnace. This was the beginning of the iron industry in northeastern Kentucky.

More furnaces were built and soon iron from Hanging Rock Iron Region became nationally known, due to the high quality of the product. Iron produced at these charcoal fired furnaces were hauled to Poage's Landing and Hanging Rock, Ohio, for shipment on the Ohio River to Pittsburgh and Cincinnati.

=== Early Ashland ===
Poage's Landing soon became a center of industry for eastern Kentucky. The first post office was at Pollards Mill that was opened in 1847 by H. B. Pollard. (Seven years later, it was renamed "Ashland" after the incorporation of the town.) It was not until 1854, however, that industrial development began with the charter of the Kentucky Iron, Coal and Manufacturing Company by the Kentucky General Assembly. The company soon hired an engineer to lay out the new town of Ashland, named for Henry Clay's Lexington estate. Martin Toby Hilton was given the task of laying out the streets; at the time, Ashland was nothing more than a few businesses lining Front Avenue and a few residences scattered along the Ohio River and near the foothills. The layout was quite controversial at the time: 100-foot (30 m) streets were considered too wide.

In 1854, Levi Hampton, one of the founders of the Kentucky Iron, Coal and Manufacturing Company, suggested that Poage Settlement be renamed to "Ashland". A name change was inevitable, as the city was becoming an industrialized region, not a mere 'settlement.' Hampton, who was an admirer of Henry Clay of Lexington and his estate, Ashland, requested the renaming to "Ashland" in respect of the famous politician. It was accepted unanimously. Lots were sold at public auction in June 1854, and the City of Ashland was incorporated by an act of the Kentucky Legislature in 1856. Boyd County was created by the Legislature in 1860, primarily from Greenup County. The first child born in the new town of Ashland was named Ashland Poage, a mixture of the old and new names.

== Rise of industry ==
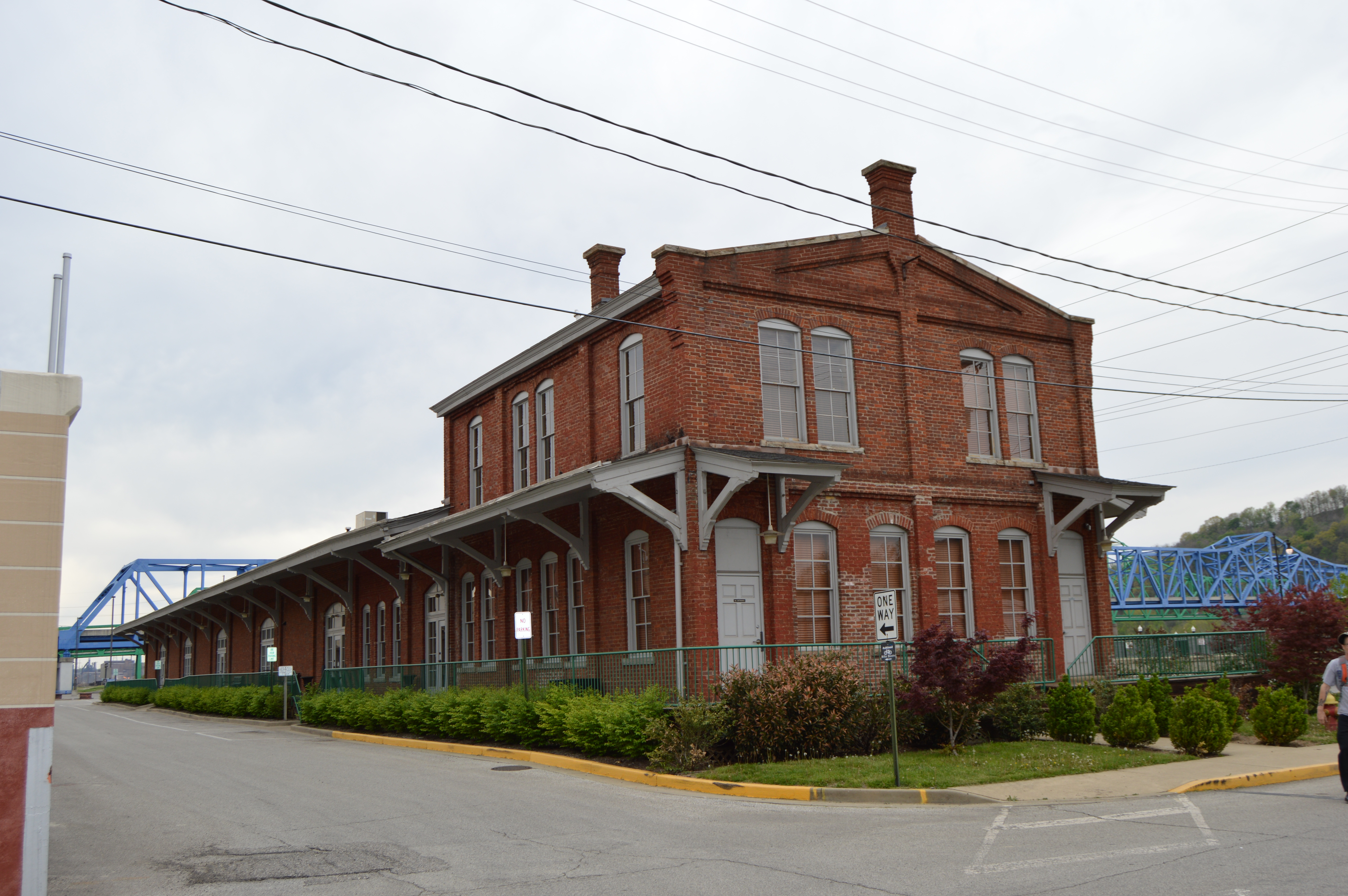
The Ashland Amtrak Station was built by the C&O Railroad in the 1890s as a freight house.

Major industrial employers in the first half of the 20th century included the Armco, the Ashland Oil and Refining Company, the C&O Railroad, Allied Chemical and Dye Corporation's Semet Solvay and Mansbach Steel.

=== Armco ===
One of the largest industrial developments in Ashland was announced in 1920. President George M. Verity, president of Armco, proposed to construct a steel mill. When it was completed on October 19, 1923, it featured a continuous rolling method to produce steel sheets, the first of its kind in the nation. Armco later purchased the old Ashland Steel Company, followed by the Norton Iron Works and the Old Iron Furnaces.

In 1920, Armco employed 3,600 but just eighteen years later, that had increased to 5,500. In 1954, the payroll increased to 7,500 before decreasing to 4,500 by 1972, 3,500 in 1982, 1,630 by 1986 and just 700 by 1992.

In 1925, the Ashland Culvert Works company was founded, later purchased by Armco and renamed to the Armco Drainage and Metal Products Company.

On March 12, 1941, ground was broken for the Bellefonte Furnace. Completed in 1942 at a cost of $5 million, it produced 1,000/tons of steel per day.

In 1950, a $40 million expansion was completed. A new hot-strip mill was opened on May 20, 1953, that employed 3,000. One year later, a cold reduction mill, strip pickler, light gauge zincgrip and a heavy gauge zincgrip was completed at a cost of $12 million. At the close of the 1950s, Armco announced another $95 million upgrade, later upgraded to $145 million. In 1963, the Amanda blast furnace was completed as part of the upgrade.

In August 1984, Tom Gorder became the president of Armco's Ashland Works. Trying to stem the loss of 2,000 jobs in 10 years, he stated he would help consolidate Ashland and Middletown, Ohio's steel mills together in an effort to improve efficiency. That resulted in the closure of the hot strip mill, however, a new slab caster was constructed that provided steel slabs for Middletown. The hot strip mill's closure in 1992, however, eliminated 930 jobs. The Sinter plant, cold strip mill, temper mills, pickling lines, annealing lines and machine shop all closed by 1995.

In May 1989, Armco sold 40 percent of its company to Kawasaki Steel of Japan; the remainder was sold in 1994 and the plant was renamed for AK Steel.

By becoming more efficient, the plant saw increasing profits. The workforce increased to 900 by 2004. On April 2, 2004, Governor Ernie Fletcher announced a $40 million tax break that would help fund a vacuum degassing unit and modification to the slab caster, crucial to coke making and steel options. The modifications also made steel production for automobiles easier.

=== Allied Chemical & Dye Company Semet-Solvay Division ===
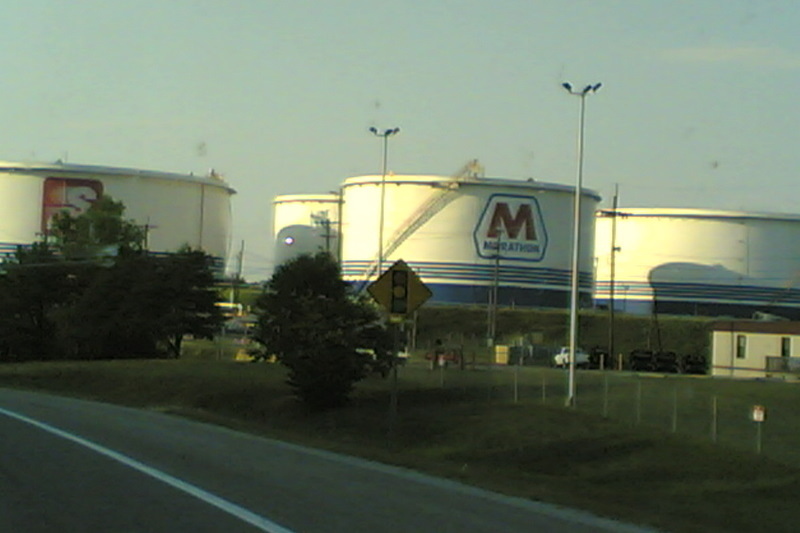
Storage tanks at the Catlettsburg Refinery

Constructed in 1912 east of the central business district, this coke plant featured 54 horizontal flue coke ovens. Four years later, an additional battery of 54 ovens was constructed. In 1937, the two original 54 batteries were expanded to 60 each.

Another large expansion took place in 1953 with the installation of a third battery. The 76 vertical flue ovens expanded capacity and increased employment. It was constructed by the Wilputte Coke Oven Division, which Allied had purchased only several years prior. It is now closed as of June 2011 and to be torn down.

In the early 1950s, a research laboratory was constructed as well.

=== Ashland Oil and Refining Company ===
The Ashland Oil and Refining Company was founded in 1924 and had purchased a small refinery near Catlettsburg that had a 1,000-a-day capacity. Its first product was "Pepper" gasoline, later renamed to "Ashland."

== Flooding ==
Following the flood of 1937, discussions for a new floodwall were initiated. Construction began in July 1949 and was completed in December 1953 at a cost of $3.872 million.

== Modern era ==
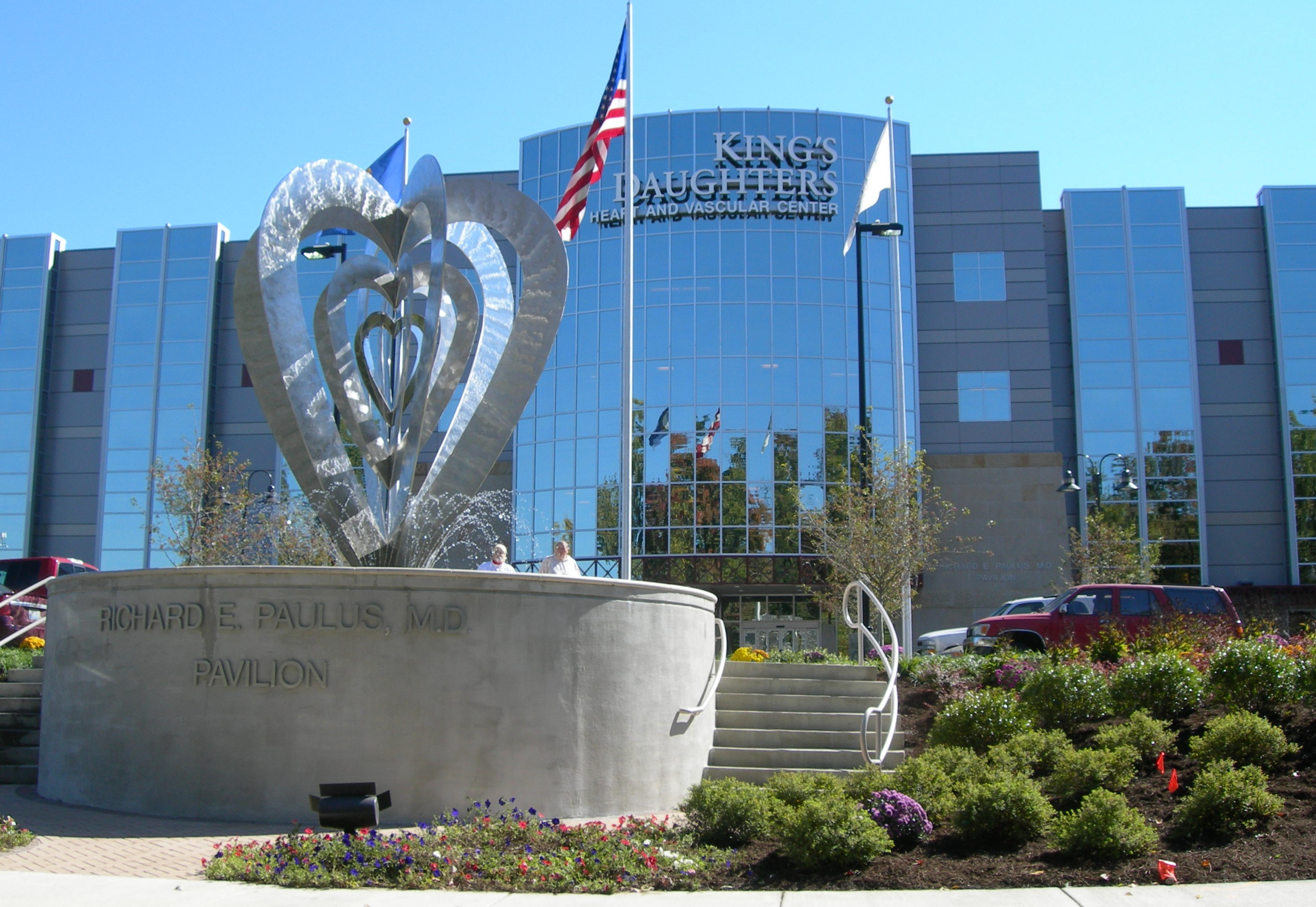
King's Daughters Medical Center

The continued growth of Ashland into the unincorporated areas just outside the city limits has reduced the city's population. Ashland has two zip codes, 41101 which is mainly within the city limits, and 41102 which serves part of the city and the surrounding unincorporated areas of the county. These two zip codes combined contain approximately 40,000 residents, which is more reflective of the Ashland community's size. In 1972, a proposal was floated to combine the governments of Boyd County, Ashland, and Catlettsburg. Commonly called ‘Unigov’ it failed 12,514 to 2,518 due to the polarity between the two cities. A commission to draft a charter to merge the three governments into a metro government was seated following a petition drive in 1988. The measure fared much better at the ballot box than the earlier Unigov effort. It was defeated by a 3 to 2 margin, although it carried the majority of the Ashland precincts. The aftermath of the initiative saw the elimination of the unpopular Ashland and Catlettsburg city stickers and cooperation in the extension of sewer lines into the unincorporated areas of Boyd County. Largely due to the sewer line expansions, growth was spurred along the US 60 shopping corridor between downtown and Interstate 64.

Those pillars of the city, such as Armco (now known as AK Steel) began reducing their workforce in an effort to stay competitive, and many of the jobs were outsourced to local contractors. The Bellefonte Furnace at the steel making plant was mothballed and the hot strip was discontinued. CSX, formerly known as Chesapeake and Ohio Railway, operates one of the largest switchyards in the world in nearby Russell and Raceland. In 1997 a former C&O freighthouse was repurposed as the Ashland Transportation Center, a passenger transportation hub for Amtrak, Greyhound Lines and the Ashland Bus System.

Taking the place of the industrial base that once supported Ashland is the service sector. King's Daughters Medical Center has expanded from a relatively small medical facility to the largest employer west of Charleston, West Virginia and east of Lexington. In the past ten years alone, the footprint of the hospital has been more than doubled. Although the city proper has declined in population, this was mainly the result of the city not annexing surrounding areas as they have developed and new commercial developments replacing former residential zones.

On October 4, 1989, the Ashland Town Center opened with Wal-Mart, Hess's department store, and J.C. Penney, along with 12 speciality shops and a food court. The 500,000 sq ft (46,000 m^{2}). mall was constructed along US 23 (Winchester Ave.) and eventually contained 87 stores and restaurants when it had its grand opening on October 19. Several months later, the 600,000 sq ft (56,000 m^{2}). Cedar Knoll Galleria opened on November 8 along US 60. When the malls were opened, Ashland Town Center was considered to be more convenient, but faced the obstacle of being built on a former wetlands and by non-union labor. However, as time passed, Ashland Town Center flourished while Cedar Knoll Galleria diminished until, in 2004, Zamias, owners of the mall went bankrupt. The property was bought by Reyton Cedar Knoll LLC and re-christened as Kyova Mall.

== Controversies ==
Jessica Thomas, then 23 years old, was arrested in early 2006 on assault and drug possession charges. She claimed that she had sex with more than a dozen members of the police department while they were on duty. As a result, an internal investigation was launched. The police officers who were accused of sexual abuse were required to take a polygraph test; four officers confessed to "inappropriate behavior" and were suspended. Nine officers, however, citing prejudice in the internal investigation, refused to take the polygraph. Those nine officers were later suspended. Three of the officers that refused the test later resigned and one was fired. The officers that had resigned stated that in order to "keep their records clean", they were forced to quit the police force.

Jessica Thomas would later plead guilty of all charges and is currently serving five years in prison for drug abuse.

In November 2006, four of the nine officers that had denied the polygraph sued Jessica Thomas and eleven Ashland police department and local government officials claiming that they were the target of an "unfair and illegal investigation, intimidation and slander". The lawsuit was filed in Boyd County Circuit Court after a similar suit that was filed in federal court in Ashland was dismissed in October because they were "not questions of federal law"; that lawsuit included 17 allegations of violations of the officers' constitutional rights.

== See also ==
- Ashland tragedy
