= Thomas Means =

American businessman (1803–1890)

Thomas Williamson Means
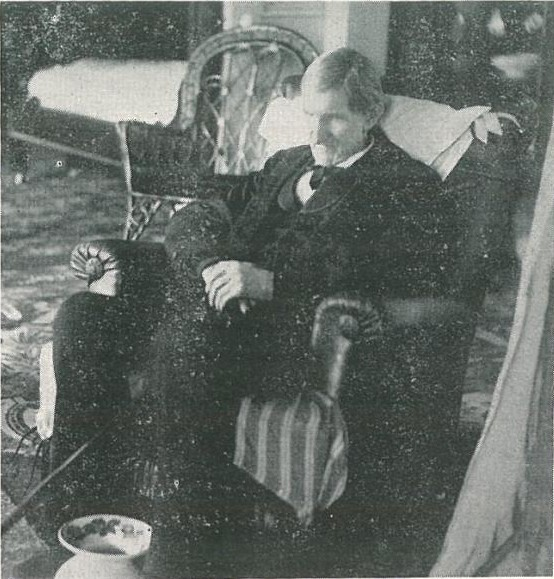
- Thomas, as he looked after his retirement
- Born: November 3, 1803; Spartanburg, South Carolina, United States
- Died: June 8, 1890 (aged 86); Ashland, Kentucky, United States
- Resting place: Woodland Cemetery, Ironton, Ohio
- Occupation: Businessman
- Known for: Businessman specializing mainly in the iron industry of the Ohio River Valley
- Spouse: Sarah Ellison
- Children: John, Margaret, William, Martha Ann, Isabella, Esther Elizabeth, Thomas Williamson, Jr., and Sarah Jane Means
- Parent(s): Col. John and Ann Means (née Williamson)

Thomas Williamson Means (November 3, 1803 – June 8, 1890) was a settler of Hanging Rock, Ohio, and a native of South Carolina. Together with his brother Hugh he became notable in Ashland, Kentucky, after he built the Buena Vista Furnace and became a director of the Kentucky Coal, Iron & Manufacturing Company. He was also the father of Ashland Mayor John Means. Means owned furnaces in Alabama, Kentucky, Ohio, and Virginia.

== Early life and family background ==
Thomas' grandfather, William Means, settled in Juniata County, Pennsylvania, and later moved to South Carolina. Several of his sons participated in the American Revolution. His youngest son, Colonel John Means, a native of Union District, South Carolina, became an influential and prominent man in that State. Thinking it better to rear his sons in the free States, he moved to Ohio in 1819, gave his slaves their freedom, and settled in Adams County. Ann Williamson, his wife, was a Carolinian by birth, whose mother, Ann Newton, was a relative of Sir Isaac Newton.

Thomas Means was born on November 3, 1803, in Spartanburg, South Carolina, the son of John and Ann (Williamson) Means. Means started his business career at the Union Furnace, then building, and he had the honor of "firing" it.

== Business career ==
In 1837, Means and David Sinton became the owners of the Union Furnace, and rebuilt it in 1844. The following year they built the Ohio Furnace, in Scioto County, adjoining. In 1847 he built Buena Vista Furnace, in Kentucky. The Ohio was the first charcoal furnace in the country, which produced as high as ten tons a day, and was the first that averaged over fifteen tons.

In 1852 Means purchased the Bellefontaine Furnace, Kentucky; in 1854 was one of the owners and builders of Vinton Furnace, Ohio; in 1863, in connection with others, bought the Pine Grove Furnace and Hanging Rock Coal Works, and in the following year, with his associates, the Amanda Furnace, Kentucky.

In 1853, next to such notable individuals as the Poage family and Levi Hampton, he was part of a hastily organized company that met with iron manufacturers at Bethesda Church in Ashland, helping to buy fifteen-hundred acres of land for the newly formed Kentucky Coal, Iron & Manufacturing Company.

Under the supervision of Mr. Means and Mr. Sinton experiments for introducing the hot blast were first made, and at their Union Furnace they put up the second hot blast used in the United States. Again in 1860 Means introduced at the Ohio Furnace the Davis hot blast, which greatly improved the charcoal furnace business of the country. He was the originator and first president of the Cincinnati and Big Sandy Packet Company. He established the old Bank of Ashland, and originated the Second National Bank of Ironton, of which he was president after its organization in 1864. Means was one of the incorporators and principal stockholders in the Norton Iron Works, and was one of the largest owners of the stock of the Ironton Iron Railroad.

By the late 1860s, with his son John, Thomas was a member of the Cincinnati, Portsmouth, Big Sandy & Pomeroy Packet Company, which owned and operated a fleet of giant packets and towboats, one of which was named the Thomas W. Means in Thomas' honor.

In 1876–77, Means built the Princess Furnace in Boyd county, Kentucky, an iron-jacketed design that burned stone coal because his nearby Buena Vista Furnace had burned all the charcoal-producing timber in 6000 acres.

== Personal and death ==
Mr. Means was married on December 4, 1828, to Sarah Ellison, a native of Buckeye Station, Adams County, Ohio, daughter of John Ellison, an early settler in that county. She died in 1881, at the age of sixty-one, in their home at Hanging Rock.

In 1882 he moved from Hanging Rock to Ashland, Kentucky, where he resided. Possessing a high sense of social and business integrity, his great fortune was the legitimate result of uncommon business ability and judgment. He was considered a man of fine bearing, about six feet in height, and agreeable in manners.

Means died on June 8, 1890. Two years later, Roswell G. Horr listed the Estate of Thomas Means, made in "iron smelting and manufacturing", as one of only 22 "American Millionaires" in Kentucky.
