= Henry Pollard =

Henry Pollard may refer to:

- Henry M. Pollard (1836–1904), U.S. representative from Missouri
- H. B. Pollard, first postmaster of Ashland, Kentucky
- Henry Graham Pollard (1903–1976), British bookseller and bibliographer
- Henry Pollard, local politician in the City of London in the UK
