= Aronberg =

Aronberg is a surname. Notable people with the surname include:

- Dave Aronberg (born 1971), American politician
- David Aronberg (1893–1967), American businessman and politician
