= Laban T. Moore =

American politician (1829–1892)

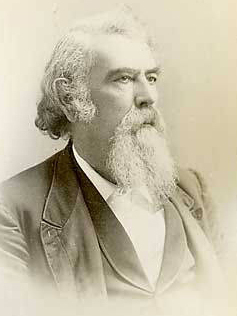

Member of the U.S. House of Representatives from Kentucky's 9th district
- In office March 4, 1859 – March 3, 1861
- Preceded by: John Calvin Mason
- Succeeded by: William H. Wadsworth

Member of the Kentucky Senate from the 32nd district
- In office August 1, 1881 – August 3, 1885
- Preceded by: George T. Halbert
- Succeeded by: F. T. D. Wallace

Personal details
- Born: January 13, 1829 Wayne County, Virginia, US
- Died: November 9, 1892 (aged 63) Catlettsburg, Kentucky, US
- Resting place: Ashland Cemetery
- Party: Opposition; Democrat
- Education: Marietta College; Transylvania University
- Profession: Lawyer

Military service
- Allegiance: Union
- Branch/service: Union Army
- Years of service: 1861 – 1862
- Rank: Colonel
- Unit: 14th Kentucky Infantry
- Battles/wars: American Civil War

Laban Theodore Moore (January 13, 1829 – November 9, 1892) was a U.S. representative from Kentucky.

Born in Wayne County, Virginia (now West Virginia), near Louisa, Kentucky, Moore attended Marshall Academy now Marshall University in Virginia and was graduated from Marietta College in Ohio. He attended Transylvania Law College in Lexington, Kentucky. Moore was admitted to the bar in 1849 and commenced practice in Louisa, Kentucky. He was an unsuccessful candidate for election in 1857 to the Kentucky State House of Representatives.

Moore was elected as an Opposition Party candidate to the Thirty-sixth Congress (March 4, 1859 - March 3, 1861). He was not a candidate for renomination in 1860. During the Civil War he established and enlisted in the 14th Kentucky Infantry, of which he was elected colonel on November 19, 1861. He later resigned from this position on January 1, 1862, and moved to Catlettsburg, Kentucky, where he resumed practicing law.

In 1868, Moore's wife purchased the Catlett House in Catlettsburg. Once under his ownership, he named the house Beechmoor for the large beech tree that stood on the property and for his surname.

Moore became a Democrat after the war and served as member of the Kentucky Senate from 1881 to 1885; he represented the 32nd district, which comprised Boyd, Elliott, Greenup, and Lawrence Counties. He served as member of the Kentucky State Constitutional Convention in 1890 and 1891. Moore died in Catlettsburg on November 9, 1892, and was interred at Ashland Cemetery in Ashland, Kentucky.

U.S. House of Representatives
Preceded by John C. Mason	Member of the U.S. House of Representatives from Kentucky's 9th congressional district 1859 – 1861	Succeeded by William H. Wadsworth
