= Charles F. Weaver =

American politician

22nd Mayor of Ashland, Kentucky
- In office January 4, 1927 – January 1, 1928
- Preceded by: E. E. Ramey
- Succeeded by: W. C. Frailie

Personal details
- Born: c. 1858 Indiana, U.S.
- Died: 1932 (aged 73–74) Ashland, Kentucky U.S.
- Party: Republican

Charles F. Weaver (c. 1858–1932) was a mayor of Ashland, Kentucky and member of the Kentucky House of Representatives. Weaver was in the Kentucky Congress in 1895. He was also a stockholder in the Citizen's Telephone Company, which was incorporated in 1896. The Ashland Foundry & Machine Works, began by Daniel L. Weaver (presumably a relative) and William Wirt Culbertson was taken over by Weaver upon Daniel's 1894 death. Weaver operated the plant until his own death in 1932 and it continued to be under his estate.

In 1904, Weaver was a delegate to Republican National Convention from Kentucky. He was also a member of the board of regents of Eastern State Teachers College (now Eastern Kentucky University) of Richmond, Kentucky.
