= W. M. Salisbury =

American physician

16th Mayor of Ashland, Kentucky
- In office January 5, 1914 – December 3, 1917
- Preceded by: W. A. Ginn
- Succeeded by: H. R. Dysard

18th Mayor of Ashland, Kentucky
- In office December 5, 1921 – May 11, 1925
- Preceded by: H. R. Dysard
- Succeeded by: W. M. Nicholson

Personal details
- Born: December 22, 1865 Aden, Carter County, Kentucky, United States
- Died: February 25, 1928 (aged 62) San Diego, California, United States

William Monroe Salisbury (December 25, 1865 – February 25, 1928) was a stormy political power in 20th century Ashland, Kentucky. He was twice elected as mayor, though on many political actions he did not court public approval, and was considered needlessly antagonistic to the popular feeling. Despite this, Salisbury was fairly active in the community during his seven inconsecutive years in office, and is noted to have attended events held in Ashland, such as the C&O System labor meeting and the sixth annual convention of the Kentucky State Association of Master Plumbers.

== Biography ==
Salisbury was born in the backwoods of Aden, Carter County, Kentucky to William and Elizabeth (Rogers) Salisbury. His father, William, was considered to have been gifted intellectually, and to have raised his eleven children (many of whom became physicians or lawyers) ambitiously.

Salisbury attended Jefferson Medical College in Pennsylvania from 1887 until his graduation four years later. He practiced for a short time in Huntington, West Virginia before moving to Ashland, Kentucky, where he became leading physician before retired in 1905 to enter real estate, operating a planing mill and lumber firm before organizing the Crystal Ice & Cold Storage Company.

Dr. Salisbury won his first mayor's race in 1913, assuming office in 1914 and serving until 1917. He was elected again in 1921, taking office in December of that year.

A retired-physician-turned-politician, Salisbury was called "the father of street paving" in Ashland for adopting rigid paving specifications. Sanitary sewers, the Chesapeake & Ohio Railway passenger station, improvement of the city's fire department, construction of the present City Building and the annexation of the Normal Section to Ashland were accomplishments of Salisbury's administrations.

Salisbury was well known for frequently being at opposite ends with Ashland's city commissioners, and as a result received the nickname of "the Fighting Mayor" in the 1920s.

Dr. Salisbury retired on May 11, 1925, after a series of controversial events and heated charges and counter-charges.

Salisbury died in a San Diego, California hospital after being stricken with a heart attack while en route home to Ashland from a vacation in Honolulu.
