= W. B. Whitt =

Mayor of Ashland Kentucky

William Boggs Whitt

20th Mayor of Ashland, Kentucky
- In office January 1, 1926 – December 19, 1926
- Preceded by: W. M. Nicholson
- Succeeded by: E. E. Ramey

Personal details
- Born: September 17, 1867 Whitt, Carter County, Kentucky
- Died: December 19, 1926 (aged 59) Ashland, Kentucky
- Party: Democratic
- Spouse: Bartola Jarvis Bessie J. Sexton
- Children: 8

William Boggs Whitt (1867–1926) was an American businessman and politician.

He was the former mayor of Ashland, Kentucky, who had also been a state senator. In 1895, Whitt organized a grocery store with Charles Kitchen in Ashland, calling it Kitchen, Whitt & Co. Three years later it was incorporated with a capital of $100,000.

According to the Mount Sterling Advocate, "the people of Beckham County are especially indebted to Senator W. B. Whitt, through whose untiring energy and wise management, the formation of the county was secured".

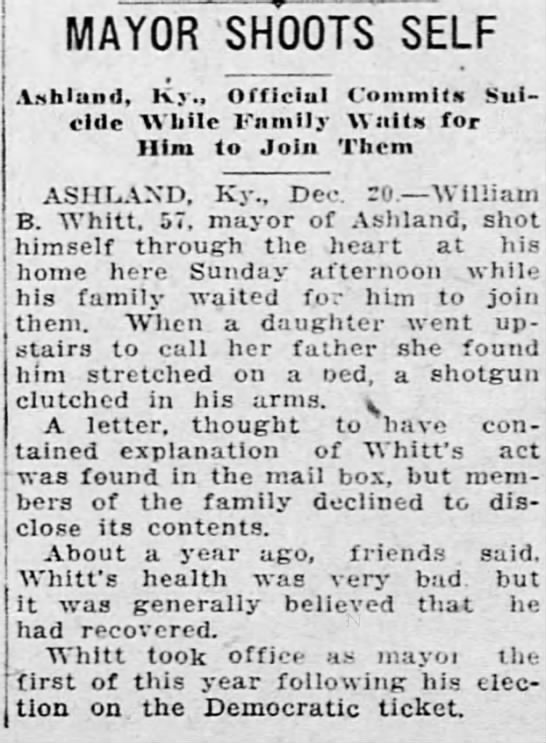
The Decatur Herald article about W. B. Whitt's death

Whitt committed suicide on December 19, 1926, shooting himself through the heart.
