= John Means (businessman) =

American businessman and politician

2nd Mayor of Ashland, Kentucky
- In office October 20, 1881 – June 7, 1882
- Preceded by: H. B. Brodess
- Succeeded by: William Wirt Culbertson

Personal details
- Born: September 21, 1829 West Union, Ohio, US
- Died: February 14, 1910 (aged 80) Ashland, Kentucky, US
- Party: Republican
- Spouse: Henrietta Perkins
- Children: Ellison Cooke; Eliza Isabelle Means
- Parent(s): Thomas Means; Sarah Ellison

John Means (September 21, 1829 – February 14, 1910) was a mayor of Ashland, Kentucky and a leader in the banking and iron industries. He helped organize the Cincinnati and Big Sandy Packet Company, laid out Ashland Cemetery, built furnaces, served as vice-president of the Ashland National Bank, and he served then led the growing iron business of the Means family. The Kentucky Encyclopedia of 2015 described the Means-owned iron empire as having "created massive enterprises out of the disorganized and weakened industry that emerged from the Civil War."

== Early life ==
Means was born to Sara Ellison and Thomas W. Means of North Carolina, a settler of Hanging Rock, Ohio. Through his paternal great-great-grandmother, he was a relative of Isaac Newton. In his youth, his uncle Hugh often worked with his father, Thomas. Thomas built the Buena Vista Furnace in Kentucky, with Hugh as a stockholder, and, in 1856, the Means brothers became directors of the Kentucky Iron, Coal & Manufacturing Company. That spring, they helped organize the Bank of Ashland, and Means became cashier, serving as such from 1866 to 1869.

== Business career ==
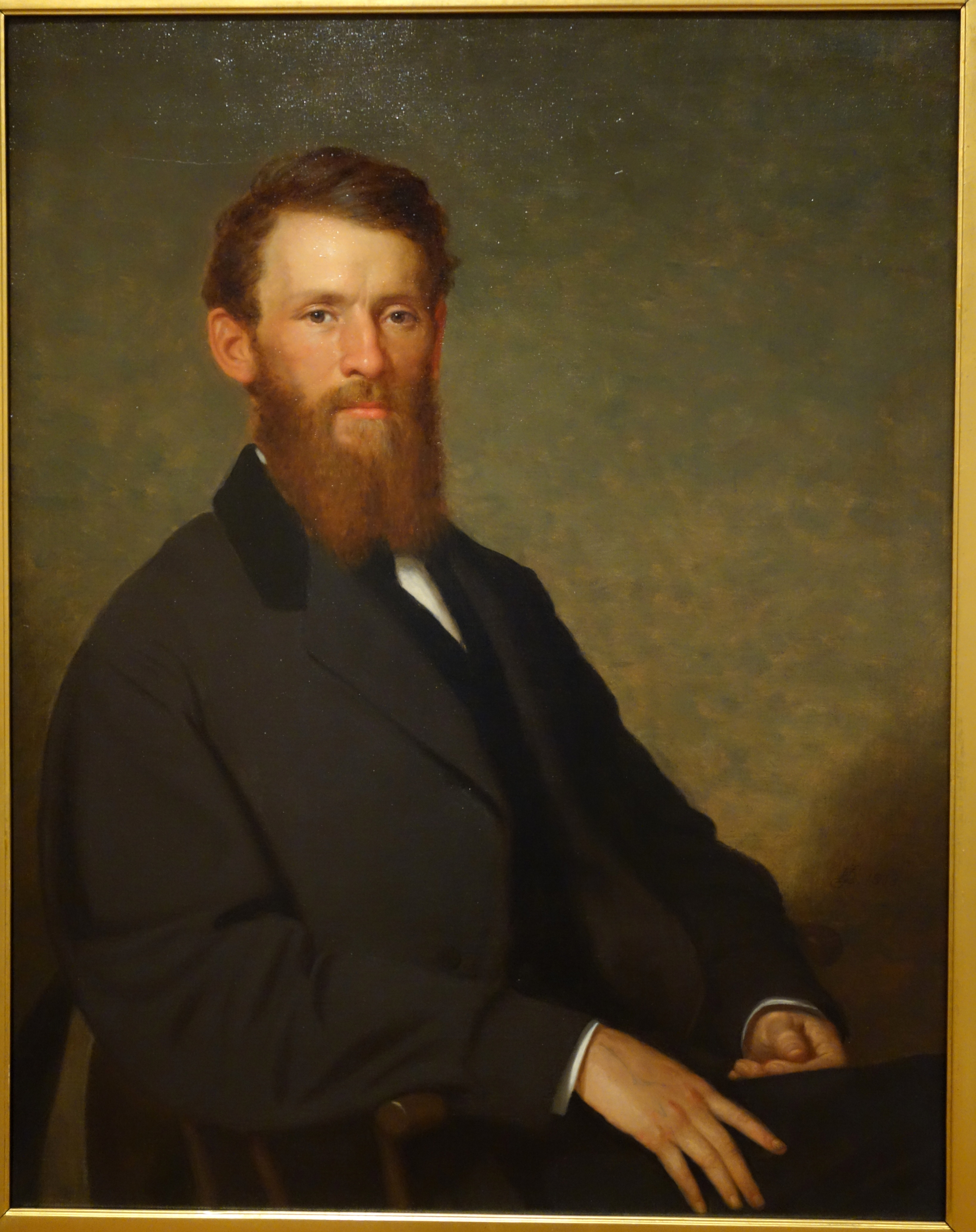
1868 portrait of John Means by Joseph Oriel Eaton

Mean's career began in 1849 when he worked for his father's company, Sinton & Means. In 1854 he was a co-incorporator of The Kentucky Iron, Coal, & Manufacturing Company. In 1856 he helped his father and uncle begin the Cincinnati and Big Sandy Packet Company, starting with one boat, called the Scioto, but soon expanding all the large freighters in the iron region. The Means were responsible also for initiating the ferryboat service in Ashland, Kentucky. Others involved in the organization of the company included Washington Honshell, David Gibson, and Hiram Campbell. The line was known as the White Collar Line, and built a number of steamers, starting with the Telegraph and later the Fleetwood.

Means helped organize in 1864 the Ashland Coal Company and also the Hanging Rock Iron & Coal Company. In 1864, Princess Furnace, about ten miles from Ashland and on the L. & B. S., was put into operation. In 1869 he was instrumental in organizing the Eastern Division of the Lexington & Big Sandy Railroad Company, and in 1870 was elected to become its president, serving that role until 1891. The Ashland Furnace Company was owned by the railroad, the furnace being built under Means' supervision. When completed, it was the largest in the United States. Means' two daughters had the honor of "firing" it for the first time on August 30, 1869. He was one of the largest pig iron manufacturers in the country by 1872. He was also affiliated with the Norton Iron Works, serving as treasurer until 1890. He was president of the Low Moor Iron Company from 1873 to 1890 and served as a director there for some time after.

When the Ashland Bank dissolved in 1872, and its directors instead organized the Ashland National Bank, John Means served as vice-president, with Hugh Means as president. He became president of the bank in 1885. Other positions he held included treasurer of the Scioto Valley Railroad, director of the Eureka Iron Company of Alabama, and partner in Means, Kyle & Co. Means was among the Ashland citizens who witnessed the November 1, 1882 shooting of a gathered crowd on the banks of the Ohio River by Kentucky Militiamen aboard a steamboat. The boat carried the accused murderers of the Ashland tragedy, William Neal and Ellis Craft, and the militia feared an attempted lynching of the prisoners by the crowd.

== Philanthropy and politics ==
During his business career, Means was a patron of education, owning the property where the Ashland Academy was located and promoting and supporting the Beech Grove Academy. He also donated the land where the Ashland school for African-American children was located.

Means bought the land for and laid out Ashland Cemetery, and was a trustee of the graveyard for many years. In 1860, he was elected a trustee of the Town of Ashland, serving thirty years in that capacity.

Means was a delegate to the 1872 Republican National Convention. In 1874 Means was a candidate for United States Representative of Kentucky. In 1872-1880 he was a commissioner to the Ohio River Improvement Commission that lobbied the US Congress for development along the river.

From October 20, 1881, to June 7, 1882, he was the president of the Ashland City Council and, by virtue of his office, the Mayor of Ashland.

== Personal and legacy ==
Means was married to Harriet Perkins of Marietta, Ohio, daughter of Samuel Prescott Hildreth, on October 25, 1854. They had six children: Thomas, Eliza, Lilian, Rosalie, Harold, and Ellison. Harriet died March 13, 1895. Means remarried June 3, 1896, to Mary Peck Seaton of Greenup County, Kentucky, a daughter of Samuel Seaton.

Means died in Ashland on February 14, 1910. At his death, his estate was appraised at nearly $700,000. (US$23 million in 2024 values)

The school that Means had donated operated as the John Means School in Ashland in from 1905 until 1960. The three-story building was demolished in 1969.
