= William H. Wadsworth =

American politician

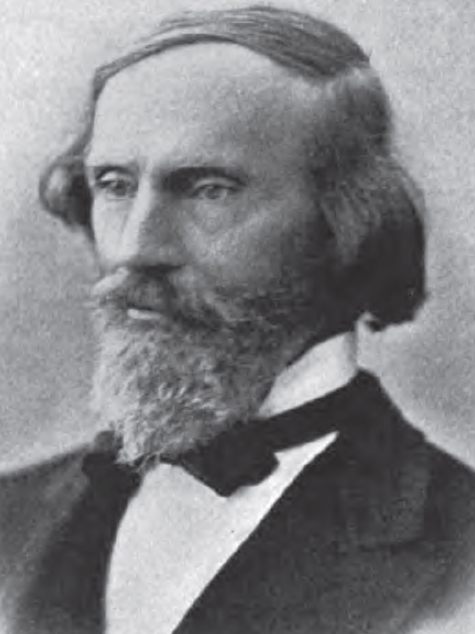

Member of the U.S. House of Representatives from Kentucky's 9th district
- In office March 4, 1885 – March 3, 1887
- Preceded by: Laban T. Moore
- Succeeded by: Samuel McKee
- In office March 4, 1861 – March 3, 1865
- Preceded by: William Wirt Culbertson
- Succeeded by: George M. Thomas

Member of the Kentucky Senate
- In office 1853–1856

Personal details
- Born: July 4, 1821 Maysville, Kentucky, U.S.
- Died: April 2, 1893 (aged 71) Maysville, Kentucky, U.S.
- Resting place: Maysville Cemetery
- Party: Union Democratic; Republican
- Education: Augusta College
- Profession: Lawyer

Military service
- Allegiance: (United States) Union
- Branch/service: (United States) Union Army
- Rank: Colonel
- Battles/wars: Battle of Ivy Mountain (American Civil War)

William Henry Wadsworth (July 4, 1821 – April 2, 1893) was a U.S. representative from Kentucky.

Born in Maysville, Kentucky, Wadsworth attended town and county private schools. He studied law and graduated from Augusta College, Bracken County, Kentucky, in 1841. He was admitted to the bar in 1844 and commenced practice in Maysville, Kentucky. He served as member of the Kentucky State Senate from 1853 to 1856. He served as presidential elector on the Constitutional Union ticket in 1860.

Wadsworth was elected as a Unionist to the Thirty-seventh and Thirty-eighth Congresses (March 4, 1861 – March 3, 1865). His vote on the Thirteenth Amendment is recorded as nay. He was not a candidate for renomination in 1864.

During the Civil War Wadsworth served as aide to General Nelson, with the rank of colonel, at the Battle of Ivy Mountain. He was appointed United States commissioner to Mexico, under the treaty of Washington for the adjustment of claims, by President Grant in 1869.

Wadsworth was elected as a Republican to the Forty-ninth Congress (March 4, 1885 – March 3, 1887). He was not a candidate for renomination in 1886. He resumed the practice of law. He died in Maysville, Kentucky, April 2, 1893. He was interred in Maysville Cemetery.

U.S. House of Representatives
Preceded by Laban T. Moore	Member of the U.S. House of Representatives from Kentucky's 9th congressional district 1861 – 1865	Succeeded by Samuel McKee
Preceded by William Wirt Culbertson	Member of the U.S. House of Representatives from Kentucky's 9th congressional district 1885 – 1887	Succeeded by George M. Thomas
