= Armstrong culture =

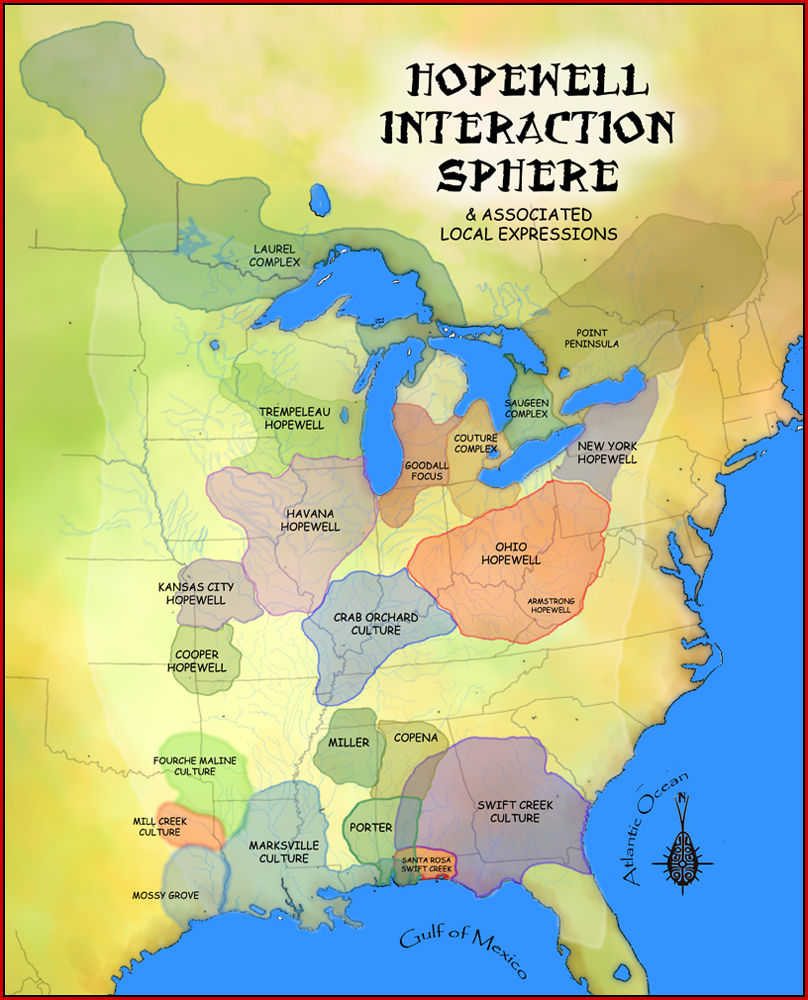
Hopewell Interaction Area and local expressions of the Hopewell tradition

The Armstrong culture were a Hopewell group in the Big Sandy River Valley of Northeastern Kentucky and Western West Virginia from 1 to 500 CE.

== Origins ==
The Armstrong people are thought to have been a regional variant of the Hopewell tradition or a Hopewell influenced Middle Woodland group who had peacefully mingled with the local Adena peoples. Archaeologist Dr. Edward McMichael characterized them as an intrusive Hopewell-like trade culture or a vanguard of Hopewellian tradition that had probably peacefully absorbed the local Adena in the Kanawha River Valley. It is currently thought that their culture slowly evolved into the later Buck Garden people.

== Material culture ==
=== Ceramics ===
The Armstrong people made clay pottery with a glazed yellow-orange color. Armstrong pottery finish was similar in color to the Peters Cordmarked and Peters Plain ceramics of late western Ohio Hopewell, an oxidized color. Peters Cordmarked is related to McGraw Cordmarked of that phase of classic Ohio Hopewell (c. 50 CE) and is considered to be a lineal descendant from that type.

=== Architecture ===
Armstrong peoples primarily focused their human resources on long-distance trade rather than mass building. Their villages were scattered over a large area and consisted of small round houses. Another feature of their culture was the practice of cremation and the building of small burial mounds in the Big Sandy Valley. They made small flaked knives and corner notched points from Vanport chert from the greater Muskingum River valley area. This period does see the enlarging of the large conical mounds by accretion cremating their dead, depositing their remains in the mounds and then adding new layers of earth over them.

=== Agriculture ===
Their limited agricultural staples were comparable to the previous Adena peoples, with most of its emphasis on vining crops like the climbing string bean, pumpkins (a winter squash) along with some of the earlier summer squashes. They also grew native cereal grasses, tubers, bulbs and gourds. Maize, although a staple to many later groups of Native Americans in the area, would not reach this area for many centuries after the Armstrong peoples.
