= Amy Gartrell =

American artist

Amy Gartrell (born 1974) is an American artist. Her work is included in the collections of the Whitney Museum of American Art and the Museum of Modern Art, New York.
