= William Wirt Culbertson =

American politician

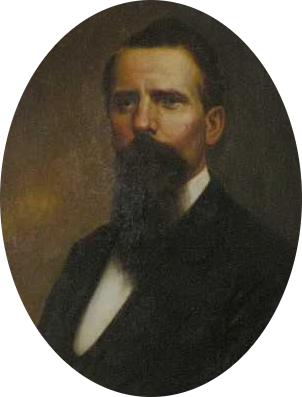

Member of the U.S. House of Representatives from Kentucky's 9th district
- In office March 4, 1883 – March 3, 1885
- Preceded by: John D. White
- Succeeded by: William H. Wadsworth

3rd Mayor of Ashland, Kentucky
- In office June 7, 1882 – March 4, 1883
- Preceded by: John Means
- Succeeded by: W. H. Eba

Member of the Kentucky Senate from the 32nd district
- In office August 4, 1873 – August 6, 1877
- Preceded by: K. F. Prichard
- Succeeded by: George T. Halbert

Personal details
- Born: September 22, 1835 Lewistown, Pennsylvania, United States
- Died: October 31, 1911 (aged 76) Oxford, Ohio, United States
- Party: Republican

William Wirt Culbertson (September 22, 1835 – October 31, 1911) was a U.S. representative from Kentucky.

== Biography ==
He was born near Lewistown, Pennsylvania on September 22, 1835. Culbertson moved with his parents to Kentucky, where attended the common schools. He engaged in the manufacture of iron. Enlisted as a private in the Union Army in Company F, Twenty-seventh Regiment, Ohio Volunteer Infantry, July 16, 1861. He was promoted to the rank of captain August 2, 1861. He resigned March 3, 1864. He was a candidate for the Kentucky House of Representatives in 1871, losing by four votes. He served in the Kentucky Senate from 1873 to 1877. He served as delegate to the Republican National Convention in 1876, 1880, and 1884. He served as mayor of Ashland, Kentucky, in 1882 and 1883 when he resigned.

Culbertson was elected as a Republican to the Forty-eighth Congress (March 4, 1883 – March 3, 1885).

On July 30, 1884, Culbertson attempted suicide by firing five shots at the back of his head. Despite a grim prognosis, Culbertson survived the attempt to take his own life.

He died in Oxford, Ohio, on October 31, 1911, and was interred in Ashland Cemetery in Ashland, Kentucky.

== Notes and references ==
- United States Congress. "William Wirt Culbertson (id: C000966)". Biographical Directory of the United States Congress.

U.S. House of Representatives
Preceded by John D. White	Member of the U.S. House of Representatives from Kentucky's 9th congressional district 1883 – 1885	Succeeded by William H. Wadsworth
