= David Aronberg =

American politician

29th Mayor of Ashland, Kentucky
- In office January 1, 1952 – 1955
- Preceded by: Will C. Simpson
- Succeeded by: Wilburn Caskey

31st Mayor of Ashland, Kentucky
- In office 1960–1964
- Preceded by: Wilburn Caskey
- Succeeded by: Wilburn Caskey

Personal details
- Born: April 3, 1893 Manchester, England
- Died: February 11, 1967 (aged 73) Ashland, Kentucky
- Party: Republican
- Spouse: Sadie Freyman
- Children: Gloria E. (Levine) and S. Harold Aronberg
- Parent(s): Lewis Aronberg and Leah (Tarshes) Aronberg

David Aronberg (April 3, 1893 – February 11, 1967) was a mayor of Ashland, Kentucky. He was also a merchant, involved in the real estate business, and a soldier in the United States Army during World War I. Aronberg was a member of the Freemasons, Shriners, Kiwanis, Forty and Eight, Veterans of Foreign Wars, and Elks, as well as the American Legion, of which he was vice commander. Aronberg was also chairman of the National Civil Defense Committee.

Aronberg owned a chain of retail stores, being the senior partner of Aronberg and Pfeffer, along with David Pfeffer, from 1923 to 1956.

Aronberg was Jewish, and attended Congregation Agudath Achim in Ashland.
