= List of mayors of Ashland, Kentucky =

Mayor of The City of Ashland, Kentucky
- Incumbent; Chuck D. Charles since January 1, 2025
- Term length: 4 years
- Formation: 1876

The mayor of Ashland is elected for a four-year term and is not term limited. The mayor presides over city commission meetings, is a voting member of the city commission and represents the city at major functions. The current mayor is Chuck D. Charles.

The city of Ashland operates under a city manager form of government. Under this form of government, the people of Ashland elect a mayor and four commissioners, who together make up the Board of Commissioners, which possesses the legislative and executive powers of the city. The mayor, as a member of the board, presides over all meetings, calls special meetings, and executes all bonds, notes, contracts, and written obligations authorized by the board.

The mayor and four commissioners are elected by the citizens to act as their representatives in all legislative matters. Their primary duties are to enact ordinances and make policies that are for the ultimate good of the community as a whole. The mayor is elected for a four-year term and the commissioners are elected for two-year terms. In home rule class cities with the city manager form of government non-partisan elections are mandatory.

== List of mayors ==
Democratic (6) Republican (13)

| Order | Image | Mayor | Term began | Term ended | Political party | Birth and death | Notes |
|---|---|---|---|---|---|---|---|
| 1 | | Henry Bishop Brodess | 1876 | 1881 | Republican | (1830 – October 20, 1881) | Before being elected, he was a local judge, and published an outspoken anti-slavery newspaper called the American Union. In 1860, Brodess was a delegate to the Republican National Convention. IN 1861, Brodess became a member of the Ashland Home Guard, an organization formed for "the defense and protection of our families and homes" from guerrilla raiders. Starting around November 15, 1862, Brodess served as a first lieutenant in Company A of the Fourteenth Kentucky Volunteer Infantry. He tendered his own resignation and was honorably discharged on November 17, 1862. During his third term, Brodess died in office and John Means was appointed to serve the remainder of his term. |
| 2 | | John Means | 1881 | 1882 | Republican | (September 21, 1829 – February 14, 1910) | He organized the Cincinnati and Big Sandy Packet Company, and was vice-president of Ashland National Bank. |
| 3 | | William Wirt Culbertson | 1882 | 1883 | Republican | (September 22, 1835 – October 31, 1911) | He also served as a U.S. representative from Kentucky. |
| 4 | | William Henry Harrison Eba | 1883 | 1883 | Republican | (November 5, 1831 – August 31, 1911) | During the Civil War, Eba enlisted in Company I, Fifth West Virginia Regiment, and was promoted to sergeant-major, March 1862; first lieutenant. He declined the post of adjutant after being acting adjutant two months. He was commissioned a month later by Governor Pierpont captain of Company F, same regiment. He was in various engagements, but none of the great battles of the war. Later, he became city truant officer. |
| 5 | | Thomas Russell | 1883 | 1886 | | | Before becoming mayor he was a street commissioner. |
| 6 | | William Worth Patterson | 1886 | 1889 | Republican | (November 3, 1849 – March 28, 1921) | He was a Freemason, an Odd Fellow and a Knight of Pythias. |
| 7 | | Patrick Moriarty Jr. | 1889 | 1889 | | (January 7, 1851 – October 25, 1928) | Previously served on the City Council for a number of terms. Moriarty served as Park Commissionaire and was one of the charter members of the first Chamber of Commerce, then known as the Commercial Club of Ashland. |
| 8 | | David A. Fisher | 1889 | 1892 | | (August 14, 1840 – January 19, 1911) | He served in the American Civil War for the Union as a private. During the War, Fisher was promoted to a full first sergeant. |
| 9 | | J. C. Whitten | 1892 | 1894 | | | |
| 10 | | Thomas S. Newman | 1894 | 1897 | | (October 10, 1851 – October 3, 1930) | |
| 11 | | William Arthur Ginn | 1897 | 1906 | | | |
| 12 | | Joseph Oscar Mathewson | 1906 | 1910 | | (February 4, 1871 - February 28, 1926) | |
| 13 | | Dr. Albert Harrison Moore | 1910 | 1913 | | (1871 - September 26, 1913) | A graduate of Jefferson Medical College in 1896, he was a member of the American Medical Association and the Kentucky State and Boyd County Medical Societies. He is recorded to have "died suddenly at his home, on September 22 [1913], aged 42 years." |
| 14 | | J. M. McCleary | 1913 | 1913 | | | |
| 15 | | William Arthur Ginn | 1913 | 1914 | | | |
| 16 | | Dr. William Monroe Salisbury | 1914 | 1917 | | | |
| 17 | | Henderson Richardson Dysard | 1917 | 1921 | Republican | | |
| 18 | | Dr. William Monroe Salisbury | 1921 | 1925 | | | |
| 19 | | William M. Nicholson | 1925 | 1926 | | | A plumber by trade, he later was appointed as plumbing inspector of Boyd County in 1930. |
| 20 | | William Boggs Whitt | 1926 | 1926 | Democratic | (September 17, 1867 - December 19, 1926) | Whitt was previously a member of the Kentucky Senate. He committed suicide on December 19, 1926, by shooting himself through the heart. He had been in ill health. |
| 21 | | Ernest E. Ramey | 1926 | 1927 | | | |
| 22 | | Charles F. Weaver | 1927 | 1928 | Republican | (1858 - October 21, 1932) | In 1904, Weaver was a delegate to the Republican National Convention from Kentucky. |
| 23 | | William C. Frailie | 1928 | 1932 | Republican | | |
| 24 | | Edgar Browne Hager | 1932 | 1935 | Democratic | | |
| 25 | | William C. Simpson | 1936 | 1940 | Republican | | |
| 26 | | Henry D. Shanklin | 1940 | 1943 | Democratic | | |
| 27 | | Clyde R. Levi | 1944 | 1947 | Republican | | |
| 28 | | William C. Simpson | 1948 | 1951 | Republican | | |
| 29 | | David Aronberg | 1952 | 1955 | Republican | | |
| 30 | | Wilburn Caskey | 1956 | 1959 | Democratic | | |
| 31 | | David Aronberg | 1960 | 1964 | Republican | | |
| 32 | | Wilburn Caskey | 1964 | 1968 | Democratic | | |
| 33 | | Charles Henry Gartrell | 1968 | 1972 | Democratic | | |
| 34 | | James J. Webb | 1972 | 1976 | | | |
| 35 | | David O. Welch | 1976 | 1980 | Democratic | | |
| 36 | | Jack T. Thompson | 1979 | 1983 | Democratic | | |
| | | Dr. Arlie "Rudy" Dunnigan | 1993 | 2001 | | (1941 - ) | |
| | | Paul R. Reeves | 2001 | 2002 | | (September 27, 1945 - September 16, 2021) | Reeves resigned from office five months into his term after being charge for possession of child pornography. |
| | | Stephen E. Gilmore | 2002 | 2008 | | (April 8, 1943 - December 11, 2024) | Previously served for four terms as a city commissioner. |
| | | Thomas E. Kelley | 2009 | 2012 | | (December 1, 1941 - August 31, 2021) | |
| | | Chuck D. Charles | 2013 | 2016 | | | |
| | | Stephen E. Gilmore | 2017 | 2021 | | (April 8, 1943 - December 11, 2024) | Gilmore defeated incumbent Chuck Charles to return to be reelected after serving as mayor from 2002 to 2008. |
| | | Matthew B. Perkins | 2021 | 2025 | Democratic | | |
| | | Chuck D. Charles | 2025 | | Nonpartisan | | |

== See also ==
- List of people from Ashland, Kentucky
