= William Worth Patterson =

American businessman (1849–1921)

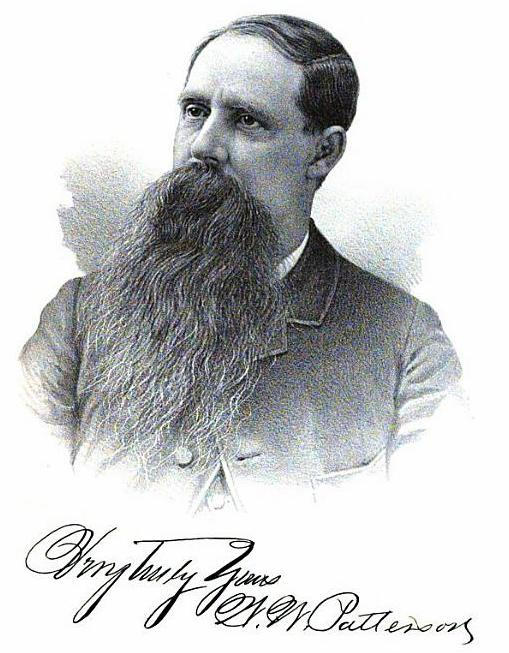

6th Mayor of Ashland, Kentucky
- In office June 9, 1886 – May 6, 1889
- Preceded by: Thomas Russell
- Succeeded by: Patrick Moriarty

Personal details
- Born: November 3, 1849 Clarion, Pennsylvania
- Died: March 28, 1921 (aged 71) Denver, Colorado, US
- Party: Republican
- Spouse: Sallie Esther Geiger
- Children: Earle Keith; Nellie Geiger

William Worth Patterson (November 3, 1849 – March 28, 1921) was a Kentucky businessman, the sixth mayor of Ashland, Kentucky (1886–1889), and the Division Inspector of the Post Offices in Denver (1889–92).

== Early life and business career ==
William Worth was born on November 3, 1849, in Clarion, Pennsylvania, to William Evans and Ellen Patterson, both natives of Pennsylvania. In 1855, his father, William, a stonemason, moved to Jackson County, Ohio, where he was engaged in the iron business.

W. W. Patterson received a good common-school and academical education. In 1870, he came to Kentucky and taught a term of five months in the public school at Beuna Vista Furnace.

Patterson entered the store of Means & Co. as storekeeper, which position he held until the spring of 1878, when he engaged in general merchandising with W. L. Geiger.

In 1880, Patterson located to Ashland, Kentucky, and entered the wholesale and retail grocery business in partnership with Col. Frank Coles; fifteen months later Mr. Patterson sold out and engaged in leasing land in Carter County, Kentucky, at which he continued about a year, and then joined the firm of Damarine & Co., of Portsmouth, Ohio.

== Government and politics ==
In 1881, Patterson was nominated by the Republicans as a candidate for the Kentucky Legislature. In 1885 he finished his first run as Post Office Inspector. In June 1886, he was elected mayor of Ashland, Kentucky.

Patterson was a Kentucky delegate at the 1888 Republican National Convention, held June 19–25 in Chicago. He was an early supporter of Benjamin Harrison, who came in only fifth place at the first ballot. After Harrison obtained the nomination and, later that year, narrowly won the elections (while losing the popular vote), Patterson chased "nice, fat government" positions as a Harrison man. The Maysville Democrat newspaper, The Evening Bulletin, ran several items on the job search and retention of the Republican mayor.

After missing out on an appointment as Superintendent of the Louisville and Portland Canal, he next applied for Chief of Post Office Inspectors in the Louisville and St. Louis district. This time he received the appointment from Postmaster General Walter Q. Gresham.

Patterson continued as Mayor of Ashland until May 1889. As the regional Post Office Inspector, operating from Louisville, Patterson investigated robberies, burglaries, and fraud. In 1889 he was promoted to Division Inspector of the Post Offices in Denver. Patterson finished his government employment in 1892, at the advent of the Cleveland administration.

== Personal, death and legacy ==
Patterson was a Freemason, an Odd Fellow and a Knight of Pythias.

Patterson died in Denver, Colorado, on March 28, 1921. A street in Ashland, off 39th Street, is named after Mayor Patterson.
