= Congregation Agudath Achim (Ashland, Kentucky) =

Former Jewish congregation in Kentucky, US

Agudath Achim
- Location of the former synagogue in Kentucky

Religion
- Affiliation: Orthodox Judaism (1896-1921); Reform Judaism (1921-1986)
- Ecclesiastical or organisational status: Synagogue (1896-1986)
- Status: Inactive

Location
- Location: 2411 Montgomery Avenue, Ashland, Kentucky
- Country: United States
- Coordinates: 38°28′11″N 82°37′55″W

Architecture
- Completed: 1938

Congregation Agudath Achim (transliterated from Hebrew as "Society of Brothers") was the first Jewish congregation in Ashland, Kentucky, in the United States. Established in 1896, the synagogue closed in 1986.

== History ==
Founded in 1896 by Orthodox Jewish immigrants from Eastern Europe, Agudath Achim services were held in various rented halls in downtown Ashland for many years. In the early twentieth century, many began to actively prefer Reform Judaism to Orthodoxy; as early as 1915 biweekly Reform services were conducted by a student rabbi from Hebrew Union College, and in 1921 the congregation joined the Reform movement. This change was not uncontested; the move led to the secession of some members, who founded a new synagogue, the House of Israel. Around this same time, Agudath Achim became a member of the Union of American Hebrew Congregations.

It was not until 1938 that a temple was completed and dedicated, at 2411 Montgomery Avenue in Ashland. The building was sold to a Pentecostal Holiness Church in the late 1980s, but it has since been demolished. The temple has been described as "the least handsome of all the commonwealth's pre-World War II synagogues", despite containing "some rather pleasing stained glass."

Agudath Achim closed around 1986, at which point organized Jewish life ceased in Ashland. One member explained that the decision to close had been delayed as long as possible, because the Jews of Ashland "didn't want to lose our identity in the community." The trustees of the congregation invested the proceeds of the sale "in case, miraculously, enough Jewish people moved here to start another congregation." "In 1998, the few remaining members of Agudath Achim met and decided to disperse all of the funds. The money was divided between Hebrew Union College, B'nai Sholom in Huntington, Ashland Community College, and a local charity serving Ashland's needy."

== Notable members ==
- David Aronberg, twice mayor of Ashland
