= Freehold Jewish Center =

Synagogue in New Jersey, United States

Freehold Jewish Center; Congregation Agudath Achim
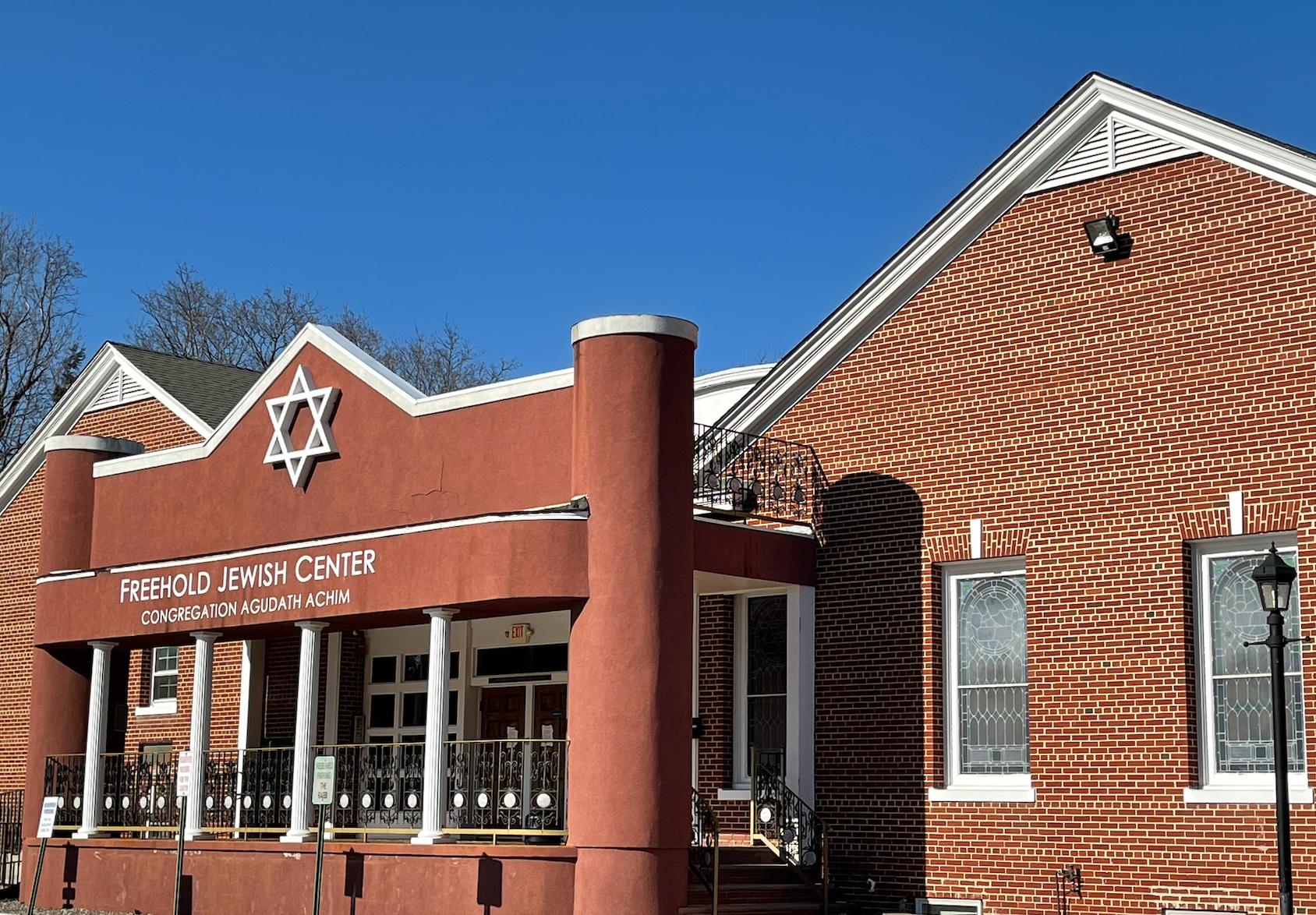
- Façade of the Freehold Jewish Center

- Location in New Jersey

Religion
- Affiliation: Judaism
- Rite: Traditional-Unaffiliated
- Ecclesiastical or organisational status: Synagogue
- Leadership: Rabbi Andrew Schultz
- Status: Active

Location
- Location: 59 Broad Street, Freehold Borough, New Jersey
- Coordinates: 40°15′31″N 74°16′48″W

Architecture
- Established: 1911 (as a congregation)
- Groundbreaking: 1947
- Completed: 1916 (First Street); 1957 (Broad Street)

Website
- freeholdjc.org

The Freehold Jewish Center, also referred to as "Congregation Agudath Achim", is an traditional-unaffiliated Jewish congregation and synagogue, located in Freehold, New Jersey, in the United States. The congregation was founded in 1911 and it completed its first synagogue building by 1916, and its current building in 1957, with an additions to the current building completed in 1973.

Eli Fishman was the congregation's rabbi from 1970 to 1997. He was succeeded by Kenneth Greene, who served for 13 years. As of January 2025, the Rabbi is Andrew Schultz, and the president is Jeffrey Malkin.

The synagogue hosts weekly Shabbat services on both Friday night and Shabbat morning. Weekday services take place on Mondays, Thursdays, and Fridays, as well as all Jewish and Federal holidays. Several Torah classes are offered.

The synagogue utilizes the Artscroll Nusach-Ashkenaz Siddur and the Artscroll Stone Chumash.

== History ==
=== Early history ===
In July 1911, a charter was drawn up for the formation of an Orthodox synagogue named Congregation Agudath Achim Anshai. Many of the founders had immigrated to the United States from Russia and Poland. Raphael Riemer, who immigrated to Freehold from Russia in 1906, was the synagogue's first rabbi and cantor. Louis Finegold, a local merchant, was the first President of the synagogue. In 1911, the synagogue had a membership of 40 families.

The synagogue was first built at a land and construction cost of approximately $1,000, as a 32 by 50 feet (9.8 m × 15.2 m) wooden structure on the corner of First Street and Center Street in Freehold between 1911 and 1916, by the Freehold Hebrew Association, which had been established in 1894. The synagogue's religious school started at that location in September 1914. Dues were $6 ($180 today). The synagogue added a second floor to the building in 1916.

The synagogue formed a sisterhood in 1920, and that year a mikva was constructed below the synagogue. The synagogue also established a cemetery on Route 33 in Freehold, which it has maintained for more than 90 years.

=== 1940–2000 ===
In the 1940s, the Ku Klux Klan became active in the Howell Township area, and members of the synagogue regularly patrolled the synagogue grounds armed with shotguns to protect it against Klan members. An old Torah on display in the synagogue was rescued from a ruined synagogue in Italy by World War II veteran Jack Steinberg and later restored. Synagogue membership had grown to 100 families by 1943, and 184 families by 1950.

During the 1950s and 1960s, synagogue membership in the synagogue reached 400. It changed its name to Freehold Jewish Center in the 1960s. Rabbi Eli Fishman was the synagogue's rabbi from 1970 until his retirement in 1997. He was succeeded by Rabbi Kenneth Greene, who retired in 2011. In 2011, the synagogue was led by Rabbi Dr. Tal Sessler.

=== 21st century ===
In 2002, the synagogue commissioned the writing of a new torah scroll, for $30,000. The following year, it was one of a number of area synagogues that took part in helping fund the building of a new home for a family, under the auspices of the Freehold Area Habitat for Humanity. In April 2003, the synagogue named its chapel the Oglensky Chapel, after David Oglensky, a synagogue member and soldier who had been a lieutenant and commander in the 740th Tank Battalion of the U.S. First Army killed in the Battle of the Bulge, who for his gallantry was awarded posthumously the Purple Heart and the Silver Star. Family members had constructed the synagogue's ark and benches by hand after his death.

In 2006, the synagogue had a membership of 260 families. By 2010, membership had fallen to 175 families.

In 2011, to commemorate its centennial year, the synagogue planned a series of events. Past president Jerry Einhorn said: “I think it’s absolutely wonderful we have reached our 100th year. It’s a beautiful synagogue, and I look forward to its next 500 years.” That year marked Greene's 13th and final year as the congregation's rabbi.

As of 2025 the congregation's Rabbi Andrew Schultz, The executive director is Tracey Barbour and the President is Jeffrey Malkin.

== Broad Street Synagogue building ==
Ground was broken in 1947 for a new synagogue, on lots measuring 175 by 250 feet (53 by 76 m) that were purchased in 1943 and 1945, responding to the need for a larger facility. In 1957, the new synagogue was completed on the corner of Broad Street and Stokes Street. The synagogue was dedicated on August 25, 1957, with Governor Robert B. Meyner and his wife as guests of honor. David Metz was president of the synagogue at the time. In 1973, an addition was added to the synagogue, containing classrooms and offices, and expanding the sanctuary.

The synagogue's sanctuary and extension are flanked in beautiful stained glass windows. The building also houses 12 classrooms, social halls, a 350-person formal ballroom, a youth lounge, a library, a smaller chapel, and kosher kitchens.

== See also ==
- Synagogues in the United States
