= Charles A. Weaver =

American businessman

Charles A. Weaver

Charles A. Weaver (April 11, 1845 – February 19, 1906), of Moundsville, a notably successful business man, was born in York County, Pennsylvania. His father, Elijah Weaver, a native of Maryland, was a whip manufacturer by occupation, and died in 1878, at the age of sixty-one. By his wife, Caroline Erb, a native of Ireland, he had six children, the oldest of whom is Charles A. The latter embarked in the whip manufacture at the age of twenty, and though burned out in the year 1869, his business became more proportions than before. His establishment manufactured about eighty dozen whips per day, and turned out about half the leather whips used in the United States at one time. In this manufacture he is associated with John C. Bardall under the style of Weaver & Bardall, and he is also a member of the firm of Weaver & Humphreys, manufacturers of brooms, the product of whose establishment is about 125 dozen per day.

Mr. Weaver's energies as a manager and financier are not confined to these extensive industries. He is also president of the Marshall County Bank, of which he is a founder. Charles is also a charter member of the Moundsville Coal company and director of the same. He is also a stockholder and director of Citizens' Natural Gas company in Beaver, Pennsylvania. Finally, he has business interests in Wheeling, and at various places in Pennsylvania and the west. His prominence as his election has recognized a citizen to the office of mayor, and he is now a member of the council. Socially he held a high rank, was a Mason of the degree of Knight Templar, and with his wife was a member of the Methodist Episcopal church. Few men in West Virginia were more prominent in business and financial circles. His success is creditable, and founded on integrity of character, alertness in affairs and superior executive ability. Mr. Weaver married December 24, 1867, to Mary Etta Richardson, daughter of W. F. and Mary Richardson, of Pittsburgh, and seven children have been born to them: May E., Charles A., William F., Harry E., Carrie, deceased, Mary Etta and Walter M.

== Sources ==
- "HISTORY OF THE UPPER OHIO VALLEY," Vol. I, pages 743-744. Brant & Fuller, 1890.
