= Charles H. Gartrell =

American politician

33rd Mayor of Ashland, Kentucky
- In office 1968–1972
- Preceded by: Wilburn Caskey

Personal details
- Born: July 28, 1914 Ashland, Kentucky, United States
- Died: July 3, 1988 (aged 73) Ashland, Kentucky, United States
- Party: Democrat
- Spouse: Nancy Tanner (m. 1936)
- Children: Carol, Martha, and Charles Lawrence Gartrell
- Parent(s): Ethelbert and Helen (Chadwick) Gartrell

Charles Henry Gartrell (July 28, 1914 - July 3, 1988) was an American state and municipal officer from Ashland, Kentucky.

== Education ==
Born on July 28, 1914, the son of Helen and E.H. Gartrell.

Educated in private schools, he graduated from Centre College in Danville.

== Career ==
Gartrell joined the United States Navy in June 1942 and served as a test pilot during World War II. Gartrell was a member of the Freemasons, Shriners, American Legion, Veterans of Foreign Wars, and Sons of the American Revolution.

A Democrat, Gartrell was one of the five candidates for the office of Lieutenant Governor of Kentucky in 1947, but lost to Lawrence Wetherby.

As the first commissioner of the Kentucky Department of Aeronautics from 1948 to 1956, Gartrell often flew the governor and senators around the state. In this capacity, he helped to build many local airports to stimulate both tourism and economic development.

Gartrell was mayor of Ashland from 1968 to 1972 and later an administrative supervisor in the Kentucky Department of Human Resources.

== Death ==
Gartrell died in 1988 and was buried in Ashland Cemetery.

== Notes and references ==
- The Political Graveyard
- The Kentucky encyclopedia (1992)
- The public papers of Governor Lawrence W. Wetherby, 1950-1955 by Lawrence Wetherby

Specific
