= H. B. Pollard =

American postmaster

Henry B. Pollard
- Other name: H. B. Pollard
- Occupation: Postmaster of Ashland, Kentucky

Henry B. Pollard was the first postmaster of Ashland, Kentucky (known at that time as Poage's Settlement), who established the post office as Pollard Mills on December 23, 1847, the same year the first adhesive postage stamps were used.

Pollard was married to Sophia Timberlake Poage, with whom he had ten children.

In 1848 he established a tan yard and grist mill near his home on the south side of what is now Pollard Road, which was just southwest of the Catholic Cemetery.

On October 1, 1849, "Henry B. Pollard of Greenup (Boyd County not yet being formed)" met at Frankfort, Kentucky to form the present-day constitution of Kentucky.

In 1854, after the Poage Settlement became known as Ashland, the Pollard Mills post office was also renamed Ashland. Despite this, the primitive industrial complex that grew around Pollard's grist mill was also named Pollard Mills, and it retains that title to this day.

Pollard's name appears in the 1861 tax index for Boyd County, Kentucky.
