= Ashland Cemetery (Kentucky) =

Cemetery in Boyd County, Kentucky

- Interactive map of Ashland Cemetery

Details
- Established: 1870
- Location: Ashland, Kentucky
- Country: United States of America
- Coordinates: 38°27′35″N 82°37′52″W
- Type: Public
- Size: 100 acres (40 ha)
- No. of graves: >19,5000
- Find a Grave: Ashland Cemetery

Ashland Cemetery Company is a historic cemetery located in Ashland, Kentucky in the United States.

== History ==
Ashland Cemetery Company was founded in 1870 by Hugh Means, R.D. Callihan, Dr. Hiram Ferguson, W.C. Ireland, Dr. J.W. Martin, Joseph H. Alexander, John Kraus, John Means, and R.W. Lampton after the Kentucky General Assembly authorized the incorporation.
