= Ashland tragedy =

1881 crime in Kentucky, United States

The Ashland tragedy is the name given to the violent murder of three teenagers, Robert and Fannie Gibbons and Emma Carico, in Ashland, Kentucky on December 23, 1881. The case is notable for the lynching of one of the perpetrators and an attempt to frame three innocent black men for the murders, in which a police officer's black assistant was complicit.

== Synopsis ==
On the night of December 23, 1881, 17-year-old Robert Gibbons, 14-year-old Fannie Gibbons, and 14-year-old Emma Carico (otherwise known under her stepfather's surname of Thomas), who were staying together at the Gibbons home in Ashland, were beaten to death with axes. Afterwards, the murderers set the house on fire. Emma's mother, next door, saw the flames and sounded an alarm. Neighbors found the three victims inside. Both girls had been raped. The father of Robert and Fannie, John Gibbons, was initially the prime suspect in the murders. John Gibbons had gone missing, and the axe and crowbar used in the murders belonged to the Gibbons family, suggesting the killers must've known where they were kept. However, many locals found it hard to believe that John Gibbons would rape his own 14-year-old daughter. Private detective John T. Norris, who initially said Gibbons was the killer, thought Gibbons had mutilated the bodies after death to make it appear they were raped to throw suspicion on someone else. A black man named Willis Hockerty was arrested as a suspect in the murders, but then released due to a lack of evidence.

John Gibbons returned to the area on January 1, 1882, accompanied by Deputy U.S. Marshal James Heflin. Gibbons was cleared as a suspect after Heflin said Gibbons had been with him since December 19. The next day, Heflin arrested three men for the murders, William Neal, Ellis Craft, and George Ellis.

George Ellis, a bricklayer, soon confessed to the crime, and implicated fellow workers William Neal and Ellis Craft. He said Craft had raped Fannie. He admitted to holding Emma down while Neal raped her. The three were taken to a Catlettsburg jail, removed to avoid a lynch mob, and returned for trial on January 16, 1882. Neal and Craft were convicted in a ten-day trial and sentenced to death; they appealed the verdict.

Craft and Neal were convicted of murder in separate trials at Grayson, Kentucky and were both sentenced to death. At his own trial, Ellis claimed Neal and Craft were innocent and that he and two black men whom he had hired had committed the crime. When William Neal's bloody coat, which was found near the scene of the crime, was presented as evidence, Ellis pleaded insanity. On May 30, he was convicted of murder and sentenced to life in prison after a lone juror held out against a death sentence. However, a mob of 18 men removed him from the jail the following night and lynched him in Ashland. Prior to killing him, the mob asked Ellis if he was guilty. Ellis said he, Craft, and Neal were all guilty and deserved to die.

To avoid another lynch mob threat, Craft and Neal were moved under heavy guard by the Kentucky National Guard by the steamboat Granite State from Catlettsburg to Ashland on November 1. Governor Luke P. Blackburn send five companies of state militia with one piece of artillery as guards. In sending the troops to Catlettsburg, Governor Blackburn had stated they were sent "to support the dignity of the law, if the whole county of Boyd had to be killed in protecting the prisoners." The group was met along the shore of Ashland by a mob of 200 men and boys. The mob demanded that Craft and Neal be handed over. Major John R. Allen refused, saying his troops would fight to the last man. A mob of 18 men and boys later attempted to intercept the steamboat in a ferry. Two shots rang out, after which the Kentucky National Guard troops opened fire. The soldiers fired 1,500 shots, killing one of the attackers wounding several others. On the riverbank, five spectators were killed and 21 were wounded.

The dead were 74-year-old Louis W. Reppert, George Keener, Martin Greer, James McDonald, a brother-in-law of the Gibbons children, 14-year-old Willie Serey, and Alexander Harris. Major Allen conceded that the prolonged gunfire was unnecessary, but claimed that he had been unable to pass a cease-fire order around the Granite State. He was later demoted from Major to Colonel.

In a last-ditch attempt to avoid execution, Craft's brother attempted to frame a black man named William Direly for the murders. Direly was arrested by detective Alpheus "Alf" Burnett in Columbus, Ohio. A woman said Direly had given her a bracelet that belonged to one of the murdered girls. According to Burnett's black assistant, Marshall Cabell, Direly had confessed. In the alleged confession, Direly implicated two other black men, Dabney Jones and Reuben Kendall, whom arrest warrants were put out for. Direly maintained his innocence and said he never confessed. The Cincinnati Enquirer supported the claims and stated that the true perpetrators had been found.

Virtually nobody in Ashland believed that Direly was guilty. On June 20, 1883, Direly was cleared by a judge at a preliminary hearing. In releasing Direly, the judge concluded that Detective Burnett, who immediately admitted that he had made a mistake and said the court's decision was correct, was honest in his intentions, but that he had been deceived by Marshall Cabell, who intentionally tried to frame Direly. Shortly after the hearing, a group of Direly's friends attacked Cabell. Cabell was shot in the leg before a marshal could intervene. However, witnesses later said that Cabell had accidentally shot himself while trying to draw his pistol.

Craft was hanged on October 12, 1883, and Neal on March 27, 1885.

== Victims ==
In The Ashland Tragedy, the three victims are described vividly, as follows:

- Fannie Gibbons, part of the well-known Gibbons family of the area, is called "a handsome girl" with a "cheerful disposition and winning manners" and "many friends."
- Robert Gibbons, the brother of Fannie, who had lost a leg "some years before in an awful event", when he had accidentally fallen "in front and under an empty car that was being pushed along a track by some of the employees of the Norton Iron Works."
- Emma Carico, better known as Emma Thomas, was a "well-developed, fine-looking girl, who was loved by all who knew her."

== In music ==
The Ashland tragedy has been described several times in song, most notably by Elijah Adams, who was the half-brother of Richard Adams, who was part of the Grand Jury at Neal and Craft's trials.
