= Nearing =

Nearing may refer to:

- Daniel Nearing (born 1961), American screenwriter
- Guy Nearing (1890−1986), American polymath
- Helen Nearing (1904−1995), American simple living advocate, wife of Scott
- Homer Nearing (1915−2004), American professor and author
- Scott Nearing (1883−1983), American simple living advocate, husband of Helen
- Vivienne Nearing (1926−2007), American game show winner on Twenty One

== See also ==
- Near (disambiguation)
- John Scott (writer), a member of the family of Scott and Helen Nearing
