= Avery Yale Kamila =

US journalist

- Born: Westminster, Massachusetts, U.S.
- Education: S.I. Newhouse School of Public Communications; State University of New York College of Environmental Science and Forestry
- Occupations: Journalist; community organizer

Avery Yale Kamila is an American journalist/food writer and community organizer in the state of Maine. Kamila is ranked by polling firm YouGov as one of The Most Popular Columnists in America.

== Biography ==
Kamila was born in Westminster, Massachusetts in the 1970s and grew up on Sunshine Farm, an organic farm in Litchfield, Maine that raised vegetables and pigs. Her grandfather owned a dairy farm in the neighboring town. She worked as a Burger King cashier while in attendance at Oak Hill High School in Wales. Kamila adopted a vegan diet in 1991 after reading “Diet for a New America,” while she was a freshman studying journalism at Syracuse University's S. I. Newhouse School of Public Communications. She graduated from State University of New York College of Environmental Science and Forestry in 1995 with a degree in Environment Policy and Management. Kamila is married to Adam Hill and they have a son. She lives in Portland, Maine.

== Journalism ==
From 2009 to 2025, Kamila wrote the Vegan Kitchen column for the Maine Sunday Telegram/Portland Press Herald. She previously wrote the Natural Foodie column and the Vegetarian Kitchen column for the Portland Press Herald in Portland, Maine. At one time, she wrote the Society Notebook column for the Maine Sunday Telegram. Kamila started work for a subsidiary of the Portland Press Herald in 2004.

A column Kamila wrote in 2018 about the lack of vegan school meal options convinced the Portland Public Schools to add hot vegan choices. The column upset some readers. The district's superintendent endorsed the idea on Twitter. The national media coverage of the vegan school lunches in Portland cited them as part of a national trend.

Kamila's recipe for pumpkin seed croquettes with shiitake mushroom gravy is included in the Maine Bicentennial Community Cookbook: 200 Recipes Celebrating Maine's Culinary Past, Present & Future, compiled and edited by Margaret Hathaway and Karl Schatz and published by Islandport Press.

Kamila's reporting on Maine restaurants using the vegan veto vote to stay busy in the winter has been cited in other reporting.

== Maine Vegetarian History Project ==
In 2020, Kamila created the Maine Vegetarian History Project and discovered 300 years of vegetarian history in the state of Maine.

Victoria Moran interviewed Kamila on her Main Street Vegan podcast about Maine's vegetarian history. Moran said: "Recently, she’s been researching the history of vegetarianism in her home state and uncovered a rich past full of meat-free and plant-based eating that has been ignored and buried for more than 100 years." Kamila's research has uncovered information about Dr. Horace A. Barrows, Rev. Henry Aiken Worcester, and James Gower, born in 1772 and the great-great-great-great grandfather of Alaska Gov. Sarah Palin.

The American Vegan Society said Kamila's history claims that nut milk is America's first milk because of the history of plant milk making within the Wabanaki tribal nations "shows how the historical record was unwittingly distorted to mask this proto-vegan tradition."

She has written about the history of Seventh-day Adventist prophet who was raised in Maine, Ellen G. White, and stated in 2022 that White's "lasting influence on vegetarian food in the United States continues today." In 2015, Loma Linda University said a profile Kamila had written about White's contributions to religion and health was an "example of the wider cultural recognition of Ellen White’s continuing impact on contemporary life."

In 2023, she presented her research at The Good Life Center, which is the former home of Scott Nearing and Helen Nearing, who wrote the 1970 vegetarian bestseller Living the Good Life.

== Community activism ==
In 2015, Kamila and Maggie Knowles co-founded a grassroots group called Portland Protectors. In 2017, Kamila was featured as a speaker at the March for Science in Portland, Maine. The group convinced the Portland City Council in 2018 to pass a strict pesticide ordinance that mandates organic lawns and gardens within the city.

== See also ==
- List of American print journalists
- List of vegan and plant-based media
