= Scott Nearing =

American economist, pacifist, and homesteader (1883–1983)

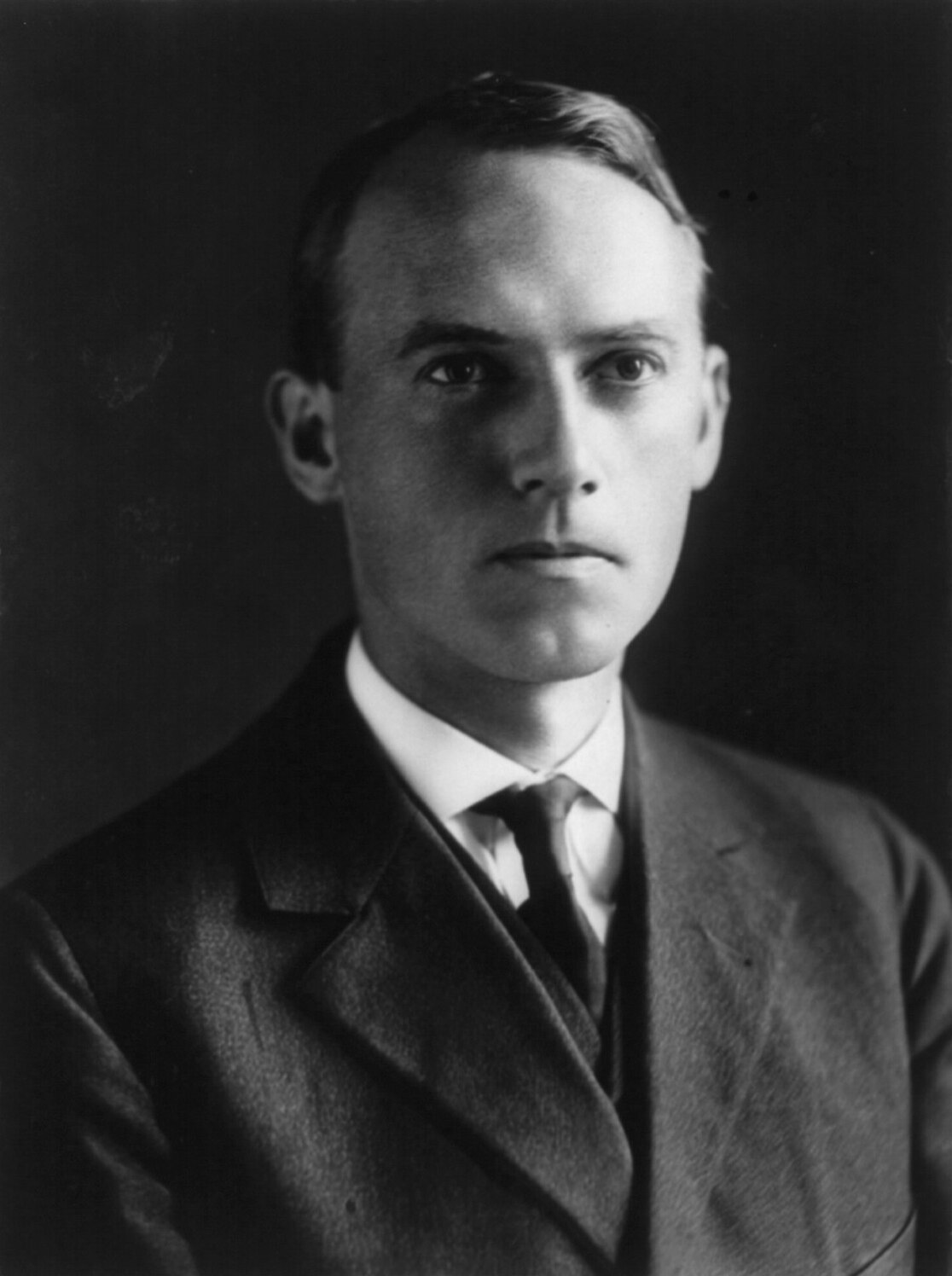
- Nearing in 1915
- Born: August 6, 1883; Morris Run, Pennsylvania, U.S.
- Died: August 24, 1983 (aged 100); Harborside, Maine, U.S.
- Education: University of Pennsylvania (PhD)
- Occupations: Radical economist, educator, and writer
- Years active: 1905–1982
- Known for: Political activist, author, and advocate of simple living
- Political party: Socialist (1917–1923); Communist (1927–1930)
- Other political affiliations: Workers (1927–1929)
- Movement: Socialism, Communism
- Spouse(s): Nellie Marguerite Seeds (m. 1908; died 1946) Helen Knothe (m. 1947)
- Children: 2, including John Scott

Scott Nearing (August 6, 1883 – August 24, 1983) was an American radical economist, educator, writer, political activist, pacifist, vegetarian and advocate of simple living. In 1915, he was dismissed from a teaching position at the Wharton School on account of his left-wing politics, becoming a cause célèbre of the American Left. His opposition to American entry into World War I led to his prosecution under the Espionage Act, for which he was found not guilty. After the war, he became a leading leftist intellectual associated with the Socialist Party of America, and later with the Communist Party USA. From the Great Depression until the end of his life, Nearing and his wife Helen lived a self-sufficient homesteading lifestyle. Together, they published Living the Good Life: How to Live Simply and Sanely in a Troubled World in 1954.

== Early years ==
Nearing was born in Morris Run, Tioga County, Pennsylvania, the heart of the state's coal country. Nearing's grandfather, Winfield Scott Nearing, had arrived in Tioga County with his family in 1864, at the age of 35, when he accepted a job as a civil and mining engineer. Before the end of the year he had assumed full control of mining operations as the superintendent of the Morris Run Coal Company, a position of authority which he held for the remainder of his working life. An intense, driven man, Scott Nearing's grandfather studied science and nature, practiced gardening and carpentry, and regularly received crates of books from New York City, amassing a large personal library. In his memoirs written late in his life, Scott Nearing would recall his grandfather as one of the four most influential figures in his life. Nearing's upbringing was that of a young bourgeois, his mother employing a part-time tutor and two Polish servants to clean the gleaming white house atop a hill overlooking the town. Nearing had three sisters and two brothers. Scott's brother Guy recalled that the citizens of Morris Run had treated the handsome and intelligent Scott "the way they would treat the heir to the nobleman. ... They all treated him with awe."

Nearing's father was a small businessman and stockbroker, his mother a vigorous, energetic, and idealistic woman whom Nearing later credited with instilling in him an appreciation for the higher things in life: nature, books, and the arts. Despite an upbringing in a life of privilege made possible in no small measure by the harsh anti-union policies of his patriarchal grandfather, young Scott nevertheless developed a social conscience, which one of his biographers describes as "a burr under his skin that none of his relatives acquired and that no interpretation satisfactorily explains."

Nearing graduated from high school in 1901 and enrolled in the University of Pennsylvania Law School, "where corporate bias so violated his idealism that after one year he quit." Instead, he studied oratory at Temple University in Philadelphia and enrolled at the Wharton School at the University of Pennsylvania, where he immersed himself in the emerging science of economics. At the Wharton School, Nearing was deeply influenced by Simon Nelson Patten, an innovative and unconventional educator and founding father of the American Economic Association. Nearing distinguished himself as a "Wharton man" during the progressive era, one of the proverbial "best and brightest" trained in practical economics to be readied for a place as a responsible leader of the community. In the words of another of his students, Patten taught innovative thinking—"making use of creative intelligence to master new situations irrespective of received dogma." Nearing seems to have found these new intellectual tools for potential social change to be exciting and liberating. He completed his undergraduate program in just three years, while simultaneously engaging in campus politics and competitive debate.

== Career ==
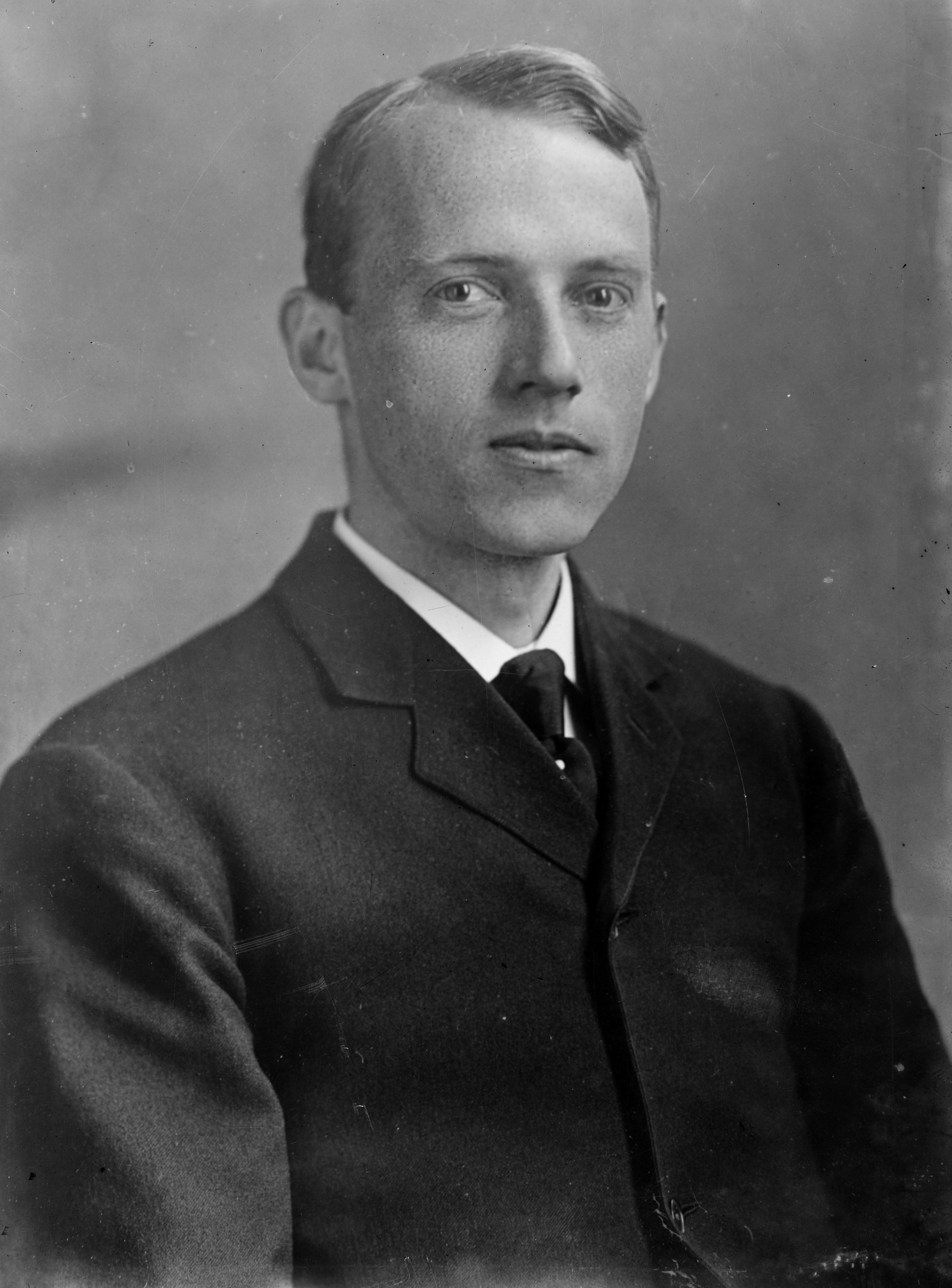
Nearing c. 1908–1912

Nearing received his BS degree from the University of Pennsylvania in 1905 and his PhD in economics in 1909. From 1905 to 1907, he served as the Secretary of the Pennsylvania Child Labor Committee, a volunteer society working to solve the child labor problem in the state.

=== Wharton School ===
From 1908 until 1915 while living in Arden, Delaware, Nearing taught economics and sociology at the Wharton School of Business and at Swarthmore College, authoring a stream of books on economics and social problems. Nearing was a staunch advocate of a "new economics," which insisted that

... economists part company with the ominous pictures of an overpopulated, starving world, prostrate before the throne of "competition," "individual initiative," "private property," or some other pseudo-god, and tell men in simple, straightforward language how they may combine, re-shape, or overcome the laws and utilize them as a blessing instead of enduring them as a burden and a curse.

Much as Karl Marx drew radical implications from the ideas of the conservative Hegel, Nearing took the economic logic of his department head, Simon Patten, and made radical inferences about wealth and the distribution of income that his mentor had hesitated to draw. Nearing believed that unfettered wealth stifled initiative and impeded economic advancement, and hoped that progressive thinkers among the ownership class would come to realize the negative impact of economic parasitism and accept their civic duty of enlightened leadership. He outlined an economic republicanism based on "four basic democratic concepts—equality of opportunity, civic obligation, popular government, and human rights."

While living in Arden in 1910, Nearing learned about The Landlord's Game, the forerunner of Monopoly, and taught it to his students. This use of the game as an instructional device led to its spread among colleges.

But Nearing's aggressive social activism in the classroom, through the printed word, and through public speaking brought him into conflict with his employers at the Wharton School of Business, resulting in his dismissal and his emergence as a cause célèbre of the American radical movement during the next decade. On the morning of June 16, 1915, Nearing's secretary telephoned him to report that a letter from the provost had arrived, saying that "as the term of your appointment as assistant professor of economics for 1914–1915 is about to expire, I am directed by the trustees of the University of Pennsylvania to inform you that it will not be renewed." Penn's board of trustees was heavily stacked with bankers, corporation lawyers, financiers, and corporation executives, and Nearing's writing had not gone unnoticed. His tenuous situation had been exacerbated by an open letter to The North American in which he challenged the right wing evangelist Billy Sunday to apply the Gospel to the conditions of industrial capitalism, including "the railroad interests ... the traction company ... the manufacturers ... the vested interests."

Reaction to Nearing's dismissal from the academy was swift, with department head Patten and others issuing statements condemning the decision. Progressives in the Wharton School compiled a summary of the facts of the case and sent it to 1500 newspapers, journals, and academics around the country. Even conservatives on the faculty were worried since, as one Wharton professor observed, "the moment Nearing went, any conservative statement became but the spoken word of a 'kept' professor." Conversely, some radicals felt vindicated in their belief in the conservative nature of the American academy. Socialist writer Upton Sinclair told Nearing in an open letter that "You do not belong in a university. You belong with us Socialists and free lances . ... Instead of addressing small numbers of college boys, you will be able to address large audiences of men." Nearing's dismissal was retrospectively called by one historian "the most famous breach of academic freedom" of the era.

=== First World War ===
Nearing in an illustration for the New York Call 1918

From the fall of 1915, Nearing was established as a radical "public man." He joined the American Union Against Militarism in 1916 and delivered a series of speeches condemning the "Preparedness" campaign then being promoted by Woodrow Wilson and the nation's political elite. He also remained a university professor, teaching Social Science at the city-owned Toledo University from 1915 through 1917. The intense nationalistic feeling that swept the country now that America was embroiled at last in the war in Europe spelled the end of Nearing's Toledo days, as he later recalled in his memoirs:

Al Miller, Chairman of the Toledo Forum, asked me to come to his office. He greeted me pleasantly and then said, "As you know, I am attorney for the Toledo Chamber of Commerce, on a permanent retainer. I am their legal spokesman; they are among my clients. They have directed me to introduce a resolution at the next meeting of the Toledo university trustees, ending your connection with the institution." He waited a moment for this announcement to sink in.

"Of course," I said quietly. "That is one of the symptoms of war fever. Those who tell the truth or try to tell the truth are among the first victims of any war."

Al hurried on, "You understand, there is nothing personal about this. You and I have worked together on the Forum and other projects with never a real disagreement, certainly never a fight."

"That is true," I said, "and I think our joint efforts have helped to make some real advances here in Toledo."

"True," said Al. "It is also true that I have enjoyed every minute of our cooperation." Then he added: "At this point I guess we part company. I hope we part as friends, on two sides of the war barrier that separates us. Please remember that there is nothing personal about this," he repeated. "I respect your stand and wish you well. My duty lies elsewhere." We shook hands and I never saw him again.

Nearing packed up his things and moved to New York City, where he became a founding member of the People's Council of America for Democracy and Peace, a national pacifist organization established at the First American Conference for Peace and Democracy, held May 30–31, 1917. He assumed the chairmanship of that organization that fall. On July 1, 1917, Nearing joined the Socialist Party and began a new job, working for the next six years as a lecturer in economics and sociology at the Socialist Party's Rand School of Social Science.

Nearing was a prolific public speaker during this time, estimating that he had given approximately 200 speeches a year during the war years. Nearing also authored a series of pamphlets, published by the Rand School, one of which, The Great Madness: A Victory for the American Plutocracy, resulted in his indictment under the Espionage Act for alleged "obstruction to the recruiting and enlistment service of the United States." This indictment came down in April 1918, but it was not until February 1919—that is, several months after the war in Europe had actually ended—that the trial against Nearing and the Rand School actually commenced.

The prosecution attempted to show that Nearing, by writing against militarism, had illegally interfered with the ability of the United States government to recruit and conscript troops for its military activities in Europe. It spent its effort making Nearing admit that he had written and spoken against militarism and the war in Europe—which he was quite willing to do. But at the end of the trial, Nearing addressed the jury and made a key point:

The prosecution has not been able to show a single instance in which recruiting was obstructed. They have not been able to show a single instance in which insubordination, disloyalty, and refusal to duty was caused.

Nearing wrote:

The only way to have intelligent public opinion is to have discussion, and the moment you check discussion you destroy democracy. ...
The Constitution does not guarantee us only the right to be correct, we have a right to be honest and in error. And the views that I have expressed in this pamphlet I expressed honestly. I believe they were right. The future will show whether or not I was correct, but under the laws, as I understand it, and under the Constitution, as I understand it, every citizen in this country has the right to express himself ... on public questions.

The judge in the case, Julius M. Mayer, dismissed the first two counts of the indictment, alleging conspiracy, without sending them to the jury. Following deliberation, the jury found Nearing not guilty but the American Socialist Society guilty on the third and fourth counts of the indictment. On March 21, 1919, sentence was passed and the American Socialist Society was fined $3,000 (short of the maximum fine of $10,000), a sum ultimately collected through small donations from Socialists, labor groups, and civil libertarians in New York City.

=== From Socialism to Communism ===
The Socialist Party of America split in the summer of 1919, with a factionalized Communist movement leaving to forge an underground existence in the years after the Palmer Raids. A significant organized "left wing" inspired by the Communist International remained in the party through 1921. Nearing seems not to have participated in the factional politics of these years, but his sympathies may well have rested with the former Socialists now building the various communist parties. As an employee of the Socialist Party-affiliated Rand School of Social Science, Nearing remained in the Socialist Party until the end of 1923.

The dramatic decline of the size and strength of the Socialist Party in the first years of the 1920s took a toll on Nearing. The plummeting membership of the SPA—down below the 13,500 member mark for 1921—stood in marked contrast to the new and rapidly growing "Legal Political Party" of the Communists, the Workers Party of America (WPA), which surpassed the Socialist Party in size in 1922 after only a few months of existence. Nearing searched his soul in a January 1923 lecture at the Rand School, later published in the Socialist press, posing the question "What Can the Radical Do?" Nearing argued that the function of the radical was not administrative, but that of external critic:

The Communist radical of today will be the administrator of tomorrow, and the Communist Society will need the radical as badly as the capitalist society needs him now. It will then be the business of the radical, as it is now, not to take an appointment as justice of the Supreme Court, not to perform any particular function as a part of the established order, but to stand apart and speak his mind about the established order. ... A radical who wishes to continue being a radical cannot do so if he is an essential part of the existing order, for then he owes a certain fealty to his position. I have seen Socialists elected to office; they become, not critical functionaries, but administrators, and one cannot be both at the same time.

It was the radical's additional function to get in touch with like-minded people in unions, cooperatives, and the sphere of political propaganda, Nearing added. It was the Communist Party's Trade Union Educational League that was currently "the liveliest thing in the trade unionism of the Middle West," attempting at "boring from within" to radicalize the American Federation of Labor. Outside the AF of L, on the "radical left" was the Industrial Workers of the World (IWW), attempting to found revolutionary industrial unions. In contrast, cooperators were, by the nature of their task, localized and conservative, in Nearing's view. Publishing was in disarray, with Charles H. Kerr & Co. disorganized by wartime repression and the economics of publishing such that the production of inexpensive books was nearly impossible. Nearing produced concrete figures to show that since 1912, membership in the Socialist Party had "steadily declined" and drew an explosive conclusion from this:

That means, if it means anything, that in the United States as it is at present organized, the radical political movements are short-lived. And if that is true, then the Socialist Party has had its day. Through the Middle West recently I found the Socialist Party almost extinct. Since 1920 it has had first the Communist Party and then the Workers Party as rivals. ...

The Workers Party has fallen heir to the present radical political situation in the United States. Is it built to represent the American worker? So far the radical movement has represented the European worker in the United States. The opportunities for a radical political party are as great as, or greater than, ever before; the important problem before the Workers Party is to get radical ideas before the workers. Its second and more serious problem is to establish proper relations with Moscow. Moscow is strong; the Workers Party is weak; Moscow can dominate without any trouble.

Despite these misgivings, the potential of the growing organization appealed to Nearing over the malaise of the fading organization. He finally applied for membership in the WPA in December 1924 but was initially rejected, living for the next two years as a non-party fellow traveler of the organization. He finally gained admission to the Workers (Communist) Party in 1927 and went to work on the staff of its daily newspaper, The Daily Worker, on May 9, 1928, remaining there until resigning in January 1930 to publish a study on imperialism that failed to pass the organization's ideological scrutiny. According to at least one historian, Nearing was formally expelled from the CPUSA in 1930 in connection with this decision.

In 1925, Nearing spent two months in the Soviet Union visiting schools and talking with educational authorities. "It was a fascinating experience to visit this important educational laboratory in its opening experimental stages," he later recalled, noting that theories were then being actively tested with regard to subject matter, method of instruction, and social organization of students and teachers alike. The result of this visit was Education in Soviet Russia, one of the first serious studies of the nascent Soviet educational system.

In 1925 or 1926, Nearing taught a class on the law of social revolution. According to Whittaker Chambers, "an infiltration of Communists ... really ran the class, steered the discussions," and tried to "make the law of social revolution a Marxian law." Members included Dale Zysman, Sam Krieger, Eve Dorf, and her husband Ben Davidson, as well as Alfred J. Brooks, Myra Page, Benjamin Mandel, and Rachel Ragozin. It also included Carrie Katz, first wife of Sidney Hook, and Nerma Berman, wife of Isaiah Oggins. The result of this effort was The Law of Social Revolution. A Co-Operative Study By the Labor Research Study Group (New York: Social Science Publishers, 1926).

In 1927, Nearing made his first trip to Asia, traveling to China by ship for a three-month stay. En route, the Kuomintang Party split, with forces loyal to Chiang Kai-shek attacking and summarily executing their former Communist allies. As Nearing later recalled:

Leftists were liquidated on sight. The procedure was summary. When one was captured by Chiang's forces, his arms were held by two Chiang soldiers while a third, with a sword, hacked off his head. The remains were left lying as a warning to other Leftists to follow Chiang or perish. I saw some heads mounted on poles.

While there, Nearing rather boldly gave a speech at Yenching University on his book The American Empire, in a room darkened so that audience members could not be later identified and denounced. Upon his return to the United States, Nearing wrote Whither China?, a book on the Chinese situation.

Nearing remained a prominent figure of the American Left throughout the decade of the 1920s, producing a series of pamphlets on various radical political themes. He was also engaged professionally on the lecture circuit, making use of an agent to arrange speaking tours for about 20 years. These speaking tours continued into the early 1930s, by which time public interest in attending live speeches and debates on political themes had waned and ill health forced Nearing's agent into retirement.

=== Great Depression ===
Nearing and his first wife, Nellie Marguerite Seeds Nearing, were the parents of John Scott. They adopted a second son, Robert Nearing. John Scott wrote a participant's account of having worked in industry in the Soviet Union during the 1930s. His book, Behind the Urals, tells of the great effort being put into building an industrial complex out of reach of an invasion. When the Great Purge started in the mid-thirties—also an indication of Stalin's preparation for war—John Scott escaped with his Russian wife and little daughter via the trans-Siberian railroad. John Scott dropped his "Nearing" last name, and his association with Henry Luce and, later, Richard Nixon caused estrangement from his father who said in a letter, "I want nothing to do with him." Nearing did not attend his son's funeral.

He adopted a vegetarian diet when he was 35. In the 1930s and 1940s, Nearing and Helen Knothe, a lifelong vegetarian, lived together in Winhall in rural Vermont, where they had purchased a large forest tract for $2200 and a moderate-sized farm for $2500. Nearing and Knothe lived a largely ascetic and self-reliant life, growing much of their own food and putting up nine stone buildings over the course of two decades. Cash was earned from producing maple syrup and maple sugar from the trees on their land and from Scott Nearing's occasional paid lectures.

However, in her book "Meanwhile, Next Door to the Good Life", Jean Hay Bright documents that the Nearings were both heavily subsidized by substantial inheritances which supported their forest farm. In 1934, around the time they purchased the Vermont property, Helen inherited between $30,000–$40,000 from former suitor J. J. van der Leeuw (equivalent to $700,000 in 2025). Louis Nearing's six children, including Scott, split the inheritance from the sale of their father's estate. “I’m sure it was one million bucks” in 1947, Nearing's son Robert said of the estate's value. Nearing's inheritance would have been well into six figures. Hay Bright's calculations make clear that while hard working homesteaders, the Nearings never came close to supporting themselves on their "cash crops" as they claimed.

Nearing wrote and self-published many pamphlets that discussed capitalism, poverty, peace throughout the world, feminism, and environmental degradation.

=== Second World War ===
A consistent pacifist, Nearing opposed American participation in World War II throughout the conflict. In 1943 he was fired by the Federated Press for his anti-war position, which Managing Editor Carl Haessler criticized as "childish." Nearing was particularly shocked by the nuclear bombing of Japan, writing to President Harry S. Truman on August 6, 1945, the day the atomic bomb was dropped on Hiroshima, that "your government is no longer mine."

=== Cold War era ===
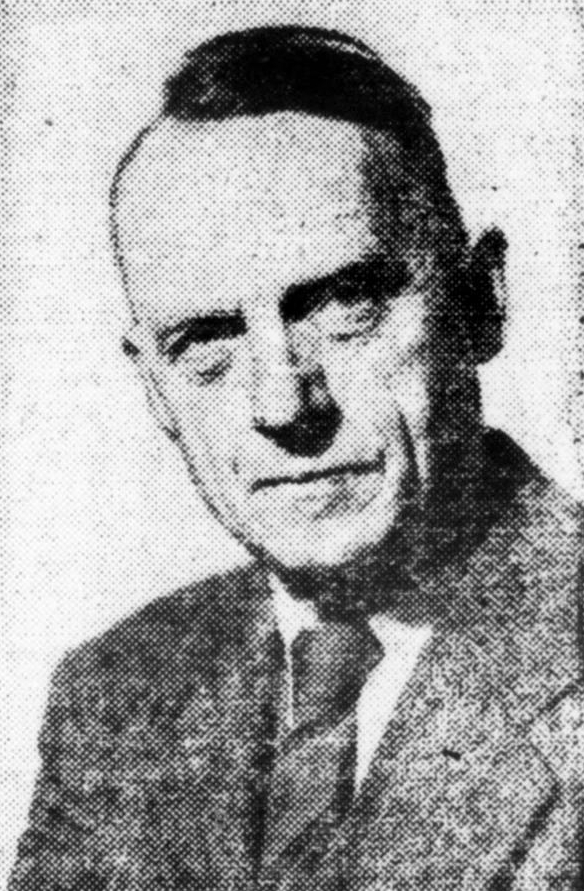
Nearing c. 1955

In 1952, the Nearings decided that their dream of a communal existence in Vermont would not come to fruition, so they moved to Brooksville, Maine. With the development of a ski area at nearby Stratton Mountain, the Nearings' 750 acre Vermont farm had increased in value from $2.75 an acre to $8,000 per acre, meaning the land they had purchased for about $2,000 was worth at least $6 million. Deciding they had done nothing to justify the increase, before moving to Maine the Nearings donated the land to the town of Stratton for use as a municipal forest.

In 1954 he co-authored Living the Good Life: How to Live Simply and Sanely in a Troubled World with his second wife, Helen Nearing. The book, in which war, famine, and poverty were discussed, described a nineteen-year "back to the land experiment," and also advocated modern-day "homesteading" and vegan organic gardening. The book became one of the main influences which inspired many young Americans, and others in countries such as Australia, to take part in the back to the land movement of the late 1960s and 1970s.

In the winter of 1956–57, the couple toured Canada, Southeast Asia, the Middle East, and Europe, generating a book about their experiences called Socialists Around the World. The following winter, with their passports issued in 1956 nearing expiration, they embarked upon a trip through the Soviet Union and the People's Republic of China. The pair visited Leningrad, Moscow, Stalingrad, Baku, Tashkent, and Irkutsk, touring schools and universities, apartment buildings in the process of construction, factories, and collective farms in the course of their trip. In China they saw Peking (Beijing), Wuhan and Nanking. They returned to Brooksville to write a book on their experiences, The Brave New World. The two countries were characterized in the travelogue as "peaceful socialist giants":

The pro-peace attitude of the people of the Soviet Union and People's China is not based on fear of war but on confidence in their theory and way of life. One Soviet trade unionist put the matter to us in this way. "We are not afraid of war. We have been through it and survived its cruelties and horrors. We know that we can take it. Just because we have been through it and suffered from it, we know how terrible war is. It wastes materials, but worse than that, it squanders human idealism, energy, wealth and life. Still worse, those of us who are trying to build a socialist society are diverted and preoccupied by war. We know from bitter experience that if we are to engage in socialist construction we cannot fight wars. War is a full-time occupation."

After their travels to the USSR and China, New Century Publishers produced Nearing's pamphlets on Eastern Europe and Cuba in 1962 and 1963.

=== Vietnam era and thereafter ===
As the Vietnam War took center stage in the mid-1960s, and as a large back-to-the-land movement developed in the U.S., a renewed interest in Nearing's work and ideas occurred. Hundreds of anti-war believers flocked to Nearing's home in Maine to learn homesteading practical-living skills, some also to hear a master radical's anti-war message.

In 1968, Nearing signed the "Writers and Editors War Tax Protest" pledge, vowing to refuse tax payments in protest against the Vietnam War.

In 1973, the University of Pennsylvania formally reversed its dismissal of Nearing in 1915 by awarding him the title of Honorary Emeritus Professor of Economics. During this time, Nearing praised Albania and described its people as "rested, secure, hopeful, cheerful," adding that "they are building solidly and fundamentally for a better future."

Nearing appears in the film Reds (1981) as one of the many documentary "witnesses", telling stories about his friend John Reed and the days leading up to the Russian Revolution.

== Vegetarianism ==
Scott Nearing became a vegetarian in 1917. Nearing was a vice president of the International Vegetarian Union. He was a regular speaker at the conferences held by the International Vegetarian Union. He spoke at the events in the 1950-1960s, in 1973 in Sweden, and in 1975 in Orono, Maine.

At the 13th IVU World Vegetarian Congress 1953 in Sigtuna, Sweden, his speech was growing "Food without Animal Residues." In the summer of 1991, the North American Vegetarian Society inducted Helen and Scott Nearing into the Vegetarian Hall of Fame.

In 2016, Portland Press Herald columnist Avery Yale Kamila reported: "In the 1977 documentary film 'Living the Good Life', Scott Nearing stands in the couple's huge Maine garden and addresses a group of people interested in homesteading. He explains they use absolutely no 'animal residues,' such as manure or bonemeal, in their gardens. 'As vegetarians, we are against the slaughter business,' he tells the crowd, 'and we don't want to participate in it.'"

== Foreign policy analyst ==
In addition to working variously as a teacher, paid public speaker, and author, Nearing wrote commentary on foreign affairs throughout his life. As an octogenarian summing up his life, Nearing recalled:

I have spent 70 years of study and travel in order to equip myself with information that would enable me to speak and write with authority on the course of world affairs. The authority I have sought is not in any sense political. It is the authority that results from collecting and classifying information on a scientific level and interpreting facts as I have found them. Since I do not speak with political authority I have no means of communicating my conclusions except by putting them in print myself and distributing them in the most advantageous way that is available to a private citizen.

Through the years, his writings on foreign affairs were distributed via several different channels. In 1921 Nearing was, along with his colleague Louis Lochner, a co-founder of a forerunner of the Federated Press, a news service that sent out domestic and international news releases and picture mats five days a week to the labor and radical press in America. Nearing remained a regular contributor to the Federated Press (controlled by the Communist Party for most of its existence) until 1943, when he was fired for his antiwar position, which Federated Press editor Carl Haessler characterized as "childish." Nearing then began to contribute to an obscure monthly newsletter from Florida, World Events.

Shortly after its founding in 1949, Nearing began contributing a "World Events" column to the independent theoretical Monthly Review, established by dissident Marxist economists Paul Sweezy and Leo Huberman. Nearing tellingly characterized the objective of this publication as "the dissemination of a true understanding of society and the reporting of dependable news of the movement toward a socialist society which is steadily spreading over the face of the globe." Through the decades, Nearing wrote thousands of pages of news and commentary on these themes, retiring from this activity only in 1970, at the age of 87.

== Death ==
From his mid-nineties, Nearing's mental and physical health was declining and he could not keep up his garden, with his wife stating that he “only began to be old in his 90s”. A month before his death, he gave up food and his body gradually lost all strength. At first he consumed fruit juices and a week before his death he limited himself to only water. Nearing died on August 24, 1983, in his home in Harborside, Maine, eighteen days after his 100th birthday. His wife Helen was present. Nearing was cremated and his ashes were spread over his farm.

== Philosophical ideas ==
During his 1919 trial for allegedly obstructing American military recruitment during World War I, at which he testified in his own defense, the prosecution asked Nearing whether he was a "pacifist socialist." Nearing's reply was illuminating; he replied that he was a "pacifist" and left it at that. Prosecutor Earl B. Barnes was taken aback and asked for clarification:

Q: Are you a pacifist even to class struggles?

[Nearing]: I am a pacifist in that I believe that no man has a right to do violence to any other man.

Q: Even in the class struggle?

[Nearing]: Under no circumstances.

Half a century later, in his 1972 autobiography The Making of a Radical, Nearing described himself as a pacifist, a socialist, and a vegetarian, writing, "I became a vegetarian because I was persuaded that life is as valid for other creatures as it is for humans. I do not need dead animal bodies to keep me alive, strong and healthy. Therefore, I will not kill for food." Nearing listed his four most influential teachers as Leo Tolstoy, Simon Nelson Patten, his grandfather, and his mother. Other influences he acknowledged in his memoirs included Socrates, Gautama Buddha, Lao Tzu, Mahatma Gandhi, Jesus, Confucius, Henry David Thoreau, Charles Otis Whitman, Karl Marx, Friedrich Engels, Vladimir Lenin, Victor Hugo, Edward Bellamy, Olive Schreiner, Richard Maurice Bucke, and Romain Rolland's Jean-Christophe.

Nearing's journey over a century was described by one biographer as follows:

Nearing's intellectual development followed a path of increasing awareness of the intransigence of the dominant classes of capitalist culture to adopt reforms that would spread the enlightenment and opportunities of the leisure classes to society as a whole. From the time of his firing from the University of Pennsylvania in 1915 through the aftermath of World War I, he experienced the limits of permissible questioning of conventional wisdom. His long, difficult journey from an orthodox reformer of the ruling class from within to a complete secessionist from capitalist cultural hegemony led him by 1932 to choose homesteading—an experiment Nearing called "living the good life."

In that spirit, Nearing moved through a series of secessions—from Christianity, from politics, and finally from American society itself. He voyaged to the wilderness as if on a pilgrimage to a sacred place. His experience, along with a deeper understanding of American culture, led to the inescapable consciousness that capitalist cultural dominance was too strong to eliminate and therefore too powerful to control or mold to liberal purposes. The secessions in his life were progressive repudiations of American canons of moral conduct as well as indications of Nearing's perception of the fragmented, segmented, discontinuous nature of American society. Only in the isolated private sphere provided by homesteading could a radical resistance and constructive challenge to capitalist culture be nurtured.

In his devotion to conscientious self-reliance, Nearing emerged as a twentieth-century colleague of Emerson and Thoreau.

This view, that Nearing chose to "drop out" of politics and society itself and live life as a rugged agrarian individualist at one with nature, is a common interpretation—and certainly one with some merit. Another possible reading of Nearing's motivations and decision-making lies in his own writing. Nearing repeatedly drew inspiration from the life story of Count Leo Tolstoi, whose life Nearing clearly saw as analogous to his own:

Count Leo Tolstoi is a classic example of an individual in potential and actual conflict with his group. He was talented and had immense vitality. Until young manhood he accepted his place in the Tsarist social pattern and generally conformed to it. After some drastic experiences and much soul searching, Leo Tolstoi challenged the social system under which he lived to mortal combat. From that point until the day he left home and died in a railway station in his final attempt to win out against group pressures, his life consisted of combats with members of his family, with members of the neighboring nobility, with the army, with the Tsarist autocracy and with the established church.

The tension between the dissident individual and the group was an unenviable one, Nearing believed. In the conflict between the solitary individual and the community, Nearing identified only three possible outcomes:

(1) The individual may win out and impose himself and his ideas upon the group. The normal consequence of such an outcome is a personal dictatorship or the imposition upon the community of an oligarchy in which the dissident individual or individuals play a prominent role. (2) The division of the community into factions, one of which upholds the dissident individual, with a stalemate leading to feuding, rebellion, civil war. (3) The group wins out, imposes its will and eliminates the non-conformist. Such conflict sequences have occurred repeatedly in contemporary and in earlier history.

Nearing's chosen lifestyle of "Tolstoian," ascetic, rural self-sufficiency may be reasonably interpreted as the attempt of a self-aware dissident individual to avoid inevitably negative participation in the internal life of the group (be it a government or a political party), while retaining a keen and almost obsessive interest in the dynamics of society and the world as a whole.

In his poem America, the Beat Generation poet Allen Ginsberg called Nearing a "grand old man, a real mensch".

== Chronological list of books and pamphlets by Scott Nearing ==
=== Titles published through 1915 ===
- Economics. (with Frank D. Watson) New York: Macmillan, 1908.
- Social Religion: A Discussion of the Place of Social Welfare in a Religious Program. Philadelphia: Friends Conference, 1910.
- Social Adjustment. New York: Macmillan, 1911.
- The Solution of the Child Labor Problem. New York: Moffatt, Yard & Co., 1911.
- Wages in the United States, 1908–1910: A Survey of the Facts Bearing on Income and Expenditures in the Families of American Wage-Earners. New York: Macmillan, 1911.
- Elements of Economics, with Special Reference to American Conditions: For the Use of High Schools. (with Henry Reed Burch) New York: Macmillan, 1912.
- The Super Race: An American Problem. New York: B.W. Huebsch, 1912.
- Woman and Social Progress: A Discussion of the Biologic, Domestic, Industrial and Social Possibilities of American Women. (with Nellie M. S. Nearing) New York: Macmillan, 1912.
- Financing the Wage Earner's Family: A Survey of the Facts Bearing on Income and Expenditures in the Families of American Wage-Earners. New York: B.W. Huebsch, 1913.
- Social Sanity: A Preface to the Book of Social Progress. New York: Moffat, Yard & Co., 1913.
- Reducing the Cost of Living. Philadelphia: George W. Jacobs, 1914.
- Anthracite: An Instance of a Natural Resources Monopoly. Philadelphia: John C. Winston Co., 1915.
- Income: An Examination of the Returns for Services Rendered and from Property Owned in the United States. New York: Macmillan. 1915.
- The New Education: A Review of Progressive Educational Movements of the Day. Chicago: Row, Peterson & Co., 1915.
- Women in American Industry. Philadelphia: American Baptist Publication Society, 1915.

=== Titles published during Nearing's Socialist Party period (1916–1923) ===
- Community Civics. (with Jessie Field) New York: Macmillan, 1916.
- The Germs of War: A Study in Preparedness. St. Louis: National Rip-Saw Publishing Co., 1916.
- Poverty and Riches: A Study of the Industrial Regime. Philadelphia: John C. Winston Co., 1916.
- Should Socialism Prevail? A Debate Held October 21, 1915, Brooklyn, New York, Under the Auspices of the Brooklyn Institute of Arts and Sciences, Subject: – Resolved, That Socialism Ought to Prevail in the United States. Affirmative: Professor Scott Nearing, Mr. Morris Hillquit; Negative: Rev. Dr. John L. Belford, Professor Frederick M. Davenport; J. Herbert Lowe, Chairman. New York: The Rand School of Social Science, 1916.
- Social Religion: An Interpretation of Christianity in Terms of Modern Life. New York: Macmillan, 1916.
- The Great Madness: A Victory for the American Plutocracy. New York: Rand School of Social Science, 1917.
- The Menace of Militarism: An Analysis, a Criticism, a Protest and a Demand. New York: Rand School of Social Science, 1917.
- An Open Letter to Profiteers: An Arraignment of Big Business in Its Relation to the World War. New York: People's Council of America, 1917.
- Will Democracy Cure the Social Ills of the World?: Debate. (with Clarence Darrow) Chicago: John F. Higgins, 1917.
- Work and Pay. New York: Rand School of Social Science, 1917.
- Scott Nearing's Address to the Jury. New York: Rand School of Social Science, n.d. [1918].
- The Coal Question: Some Reasons Why It is Pressing and Some Suggestions for Solving It. New York: Rand School of Social Science, 1918.
- The Debs Decision. New York: Rand School of Social Science, 1919.
- Before the Court: Nearing — Debs: 1. Nearing's Summing-Up Speech; 2. Debs' Statement to the Court. (with Eugene V. Debs) New York: People's Print, n.d. [1919].
- Violence or Solidarity? or, Will Guns Settle It? New York: People's Printer, n.d. [1919].
- Labor and the League of Nations: With the Full Text of the Revised Covenant of the League of Nations. New York: Rand School of Social Science, 1919.
- The Trial of Scott Nearing and the American Socialist Society: United States District Court for the Southern District of New York City City, February 5 to 19, 1919. (Introduction by Morris Hillquit.) New York: Rand School of Social Science, 1919.
- The Human Element in Economics: Twelve Lessons. New York: Rand School of Social Science, Correspondence Dept., n.d. [1919].
- Europe and the Next World War. New York: Rand School of Social Science, 1920.
- Europe in Revolution: A Letter from Scott Nearing. New York: Rand School of Social Science, 1920.
- A Nation Divided, or, Plutocracy versus Democracy. Chicago: Socialist Party of the United States, 1920.
- The New Slavery. Chicago: Socialist Party of the United States, 1920.
- The One Big Union of Business. New York: Rand School of Social Science, 1920.
- Would the Practice of Christ's Teaching Make for Social Progress? Debate Between Scott Nearing and Percy Ward. Girard, KS: Appeal to Reason, 1920.
- The American Empire. New York: Rand School of Social Science, 1921.
- Rationalism versus Socialism. Debate Between Scott Nearing and Percy Ward. Chicago: Kimball Hall, 1921.
- A Public Debate: Capitalism vs. Socialism. (with Edwin R.A. Seligman) New York: The Fine Arts Guild, 1921. – reissued in 1924 as a Haldeman-Julius "Little Blue Book"
- Can the Church Be Radical? Debate Held at the Lexington Theatre, Sunday Afternoon, February 12, 1922: Affirmative, John Haynes Holmes, Minister of the Community Church; Negative, Scott Nearing, Lecturer in the Rand School. (with John Haynes Holmes) New York: Hanford Press, 1922.
- The Next Step: A Plan for Economic World Federation. Ridgewood, NJ: Nellie Seeds Nearing, 1922.
- Irrepressible America. New York: League for Industrial Democracy, 1922.
- Oil and the Germs of War. Ridgewood, NJ: Nellie Seeds Nearing, 1923.

=== Titles published during Nearing's Communist period (1924–1929) ===
- Bolshevism and the West. Debate Between Scott Nearing and Bertrand Russell. New York: The League for Public Discussion, 1924.
- Soviet Form of Government: Its Application to Western Civilization. Girard, KS: Haldeman-Julius Co., 1924.
- Dollar Diplomacy : a Study in American Imperialism. (with Joseph Freeman) New York: B.W. Huebsch, 1925.
- Educational Frontiers: A book about Simon Nelson Patten and Other Teachers. New York: Thomas Seltzer, 1925.
- Has Propaganda Any Value in Education? Debate Between Scott Nearing and Alexis Fern. New York: Rand School of Social Science, 1925.
- Education in Soviet Russia. New York: International Publishers, 1926.
- Glimpses of the Soviet Republic. New York: Social Science Publishers, 1926.
- Russia Turns East. New York: Social Science Publishers, 1926.
- British Labor Bids for Power: The Historic Scarboro Conference of the Trades Union Congress. New York: Social Science Publishers, 1926.
- Stopping a War: The Fight of the French Workers Against the Moroccan Campaign of 1925. New York: Social Science Publishers, 1926.
- The Law of Social Revolution. A Co-Operative Study by the Labor Research Study Group. New York: Social Science Publishers, 1926.
- World Labor Unity. New York: Social Science Publishers, 1926.
- The British General Strike: An Economic Interpretation of its Background and its Significance. New York: Vanguard Press, 1927.
- The Economic Organization of the Soviet Union (with Jack Hardy) New York: Vanguard Press, 1927.
- Where is Civilization Going?. New York: Vanguard Press, 1927.
- The Future of Capitalism and Socialism in America. (with Sam Adolph Lewisohn, Malcolm Churchill Rorty, and Morris Hillquit.) New York: League for Industrial Democracy, 1927.
- Whither China? An Economic Interpretation of Recent Events in the Far East. New York: International Publishers, 1927.
- Black America. New York: Vanguard Press, 1929.

=== Independent radicalism from the Depression through World War II (1930–1945) ===
- The Twilight of Empire: An Economic Interpretation of Imperialist Cycles. New York: Vanguard Press, 1930.
- Why Hard Times?: A Study of the Economic and Social Forces That Are Sweeping Away Capitalist Imperialism. New York: Urquhart Press, n.d. [1931].
- The Decisive Year, 1931: Capitalism, Imperialism, Sovietism Before the Bar of History. New York: Rand School of Social Science, n.d. [1931].
- A Warless World: Is a Warless World Possible? New York: Vanguard Press, 1931.
- War: Organized Destruction and Mass Murder by Civilized Nations. New York: Vanguard Press, 1931.
- The One Way Out. New York: Vanguard Press, 1932.
- Must We Starve? New York: Vanguard Press, 1932.
- Which Offers More for the Future? Communism: Scott Nearing; Socialism: Norman Thomas; Capitalism: Don D. Lescohier. Chicago: Popular Interest Series Publishing Co., 1932.
- Fascism. n.c. [Ridgewood, NJ]: Scott Nearing, n.d. [1933].
- Europe – West and East. Ridgewood, NJ: Scott Nearing, n.d. [1934].
- An ABC of Communism. Ridgewood, NJ: Scott Nearing, n.d. [1935].
- The European Civil War: The First Twenty Years, 1917–1936. Baltimore: Christian Social Justice Fund, 1936.
- The Rise and Decline of Christian Civilization. Ridgewood, NJ: Scott Nearing, n.d. [1940].
- United World. Mays Landing, NJ: Open Road Press, 1944.
- Democracy is Not Enough. New York: Island Press, 1945.
- The Soviet Union as a World Power. New York: Island Press, 1945.
- The Tragedy of Empire. New York: Island Press, 1945.

=== Independent radicalism after World War II (1946–1979) ===
- The Revolution of Our Time. New York: Island Press, 1947.
- The Illusion of Free Enterprise. Boston: Boston Community Church, 1948.
- Why I Believe in Socialism. Washington, D. C.: World Events Committee, 1949.
- The Maple Sugar Book: being a plain practical account of the Art of Sugaring designed to promote an acquaintance with the Ancient as well as the Modern practice, together with remarks on Pioneering as a way of living in the twentieth century. (with Helen Nearing) New York: John Day Co., 1950.
- Cooperation and Peace or Competition and War. East Palatka, FL: World Events Committee, 1951.
- Economics for the Power Age. East Palatka, FL: World Events Committee, 1952.
- Man's Search for the Good Life. Harborside, ME: Social Science Institute, 1954.
- To Promote The General Welfare. Harborside, ME: Social Science Institute, 1954.
- USA Today: Reporting Extensive Journeys and First-Hand Observations, Commenting on Their Meaning and Offering Conclusions Regarding Present-Day Trends in the Domestic and International Affairs of the United States. (with Helen Nearing) Harborside, ME: Social Science Institute, 1955.
- Our Right to Travel. (with Helen Nearing) Harborside, ME: Social Science Institute, 1956.
- Socialists Around the World. (with Helen Nearing) New York: Monthly Review Press, 1958.
- The Brave New World. (with Helen Nearing) Harborside, ME: Social Science Institute, 1958.
- Soviet Education: What Does It Offer America? An Illustrated Eyewitness Report. Harborside, ME: Social Science Institute, n.d. [1958].
- Freedom: Promise and Menace: A Critique on the Cult of Freedom. Harborside, ME: Social Science Institute, 1961.
- Socialism in Practice: Transformation of East Europe. New York: New Century Publishers, 1962.
- Cuba and Latin America: Eyewitness Report on the Continental Congress for Solidarity with Cuba. New York: New Century Publishers, 1963.
- The Conscience of a Radical. Harborside, ME: Social Science Institute, 1965.
- Living the Good Life: How to Live Sanely and Simply in a Troubled World. New York: Schocken Books, 1970.
- The Making of a Radical: A Political Autobiography. New York: Harper and Row, 1972.
- Civilization and Beyond: Learning From History. Harborside, ME: Social Science Institute, 1975.
- Building and Using Our Sun-Heated Greenhouse: Grow Vegetables All Year Round. (with Helen Nearing) Charlotte, VT: Garden Way Publishing, 1978.
- Continuing the Good Life: Half a Century of Homesteading. New York: Schocken Books, 1979.
