= Hobby Farms (magazine) =

US magazine

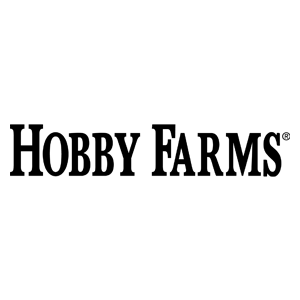
- Hobby Farms logo
- Categories: Lifestyle magazine
- Frequency: Bimonthly
- Total circulation: 143,927 (2011)
- First issue: March 2001
- Company: EG Media Investment, LLC
- Country: USA
- Based in: Lexington, Kentucky
- Language: English
- Website: www.hobbyfarms.com
- ISSN: 1533-0931

Hobby Farms is a bimonthly magazine, devoted to the life of hobby farmers, homesteaders and small producers. Its editorial offices are based in Lexington, Kentucky. Hobby Farms magazine's tagline is "Rural Living for Pleasure and Profit". The magazine is known for its award-winning design and photography.

== History ==
The magazine was the brainchild of Norman Ridker, founder and chairman of BowTie Inc. In 1999, he was visiting a friend and business associate in upstate New York who enjoyed making maple syrup on his farm in his spare time. Looking around at the farm and his friend's life—a working professional who enjoyed farming as a hobby—he realized that no magazine existed that served him and others like him. He enlisted editors to begin researching "hobby farmers" and the seeming groundswell of urban professionals moving to the country seeking a more meaningful existence and with a desire to farm in their spare time. Finding that a very real need existed for education and basic information about farming for such individuals, BowTie trademarked the term "hobby farm", and launched Hobby Farms magazine in the spring of 2001.

In 2004 Hobby Farms editorial office moved from Irvine, California, to Lexington, Kentucky. The magazine helps small producers in the United States and around the world turn their hobby into a viable business. Focused on the modern "back-to-the-land movement", the magazine is designed to appeal to older Gen Xers, Baby Boomers and the growing population in between who are in tune with organic growing methods and lifestyle.

Hobby Farms features articles on raising livestock humanely, sustainable agriculture, marketing a small farm, self sufficiency, history and preservation, and the dangers of factory farms. Columns cover farm equipment and tools, cooking, buying land, and agricultural news and trends.

The magazine thrived in 2006, and was the fastest-growing farm publication in the country. In 2013 the magazine was acquired by I-5 Publishing LLC.
