= Edward Giobbi =

American artist and cookbook author (1926–2026)

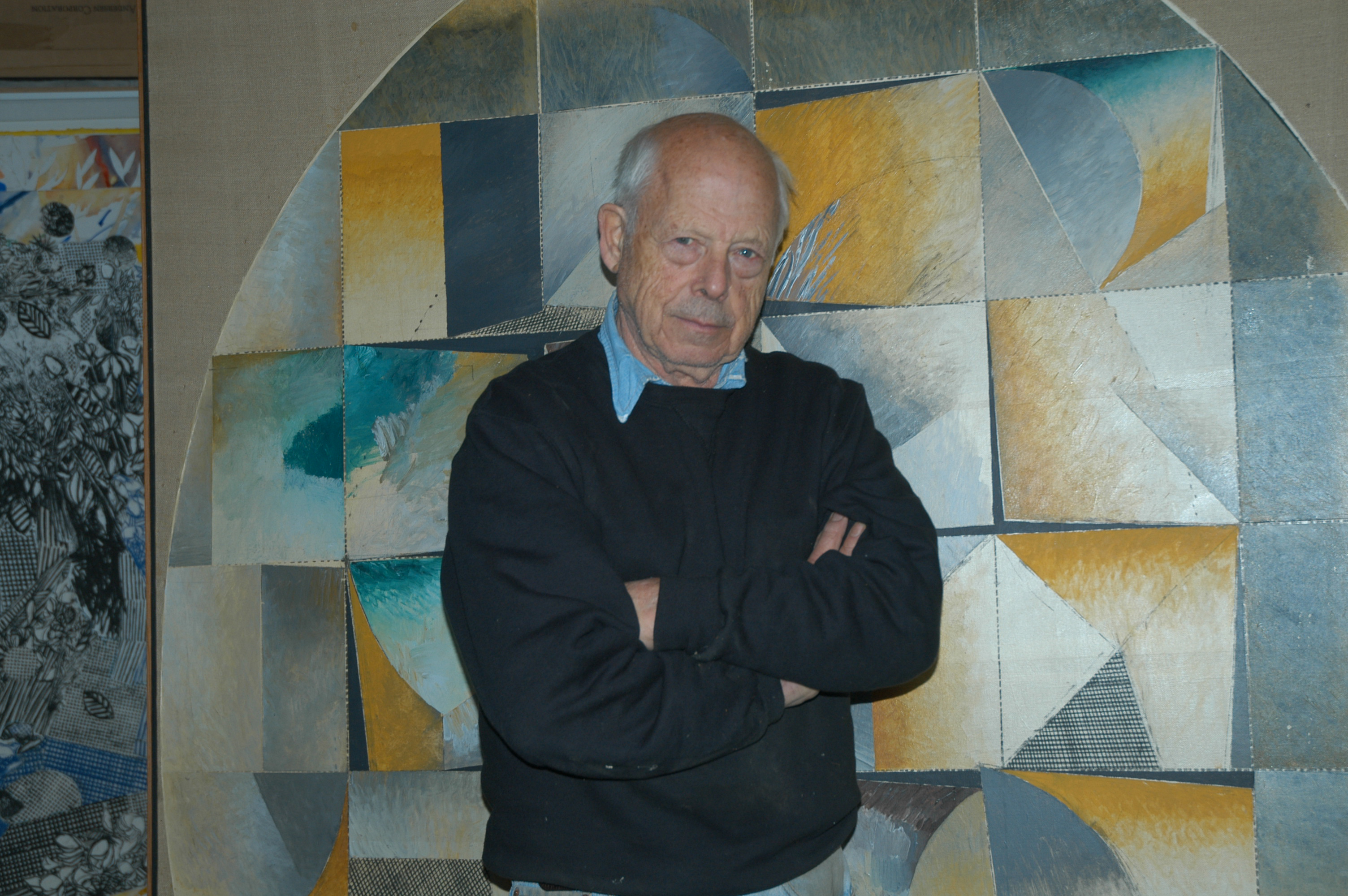
Edward Giobbi in 2009

Edward Gioachino Giobbi (July 18, 1926 – May 9, 2026) was an American artist and cookbook author.

Giobbi's paintings and other renderings mostly appear in collections in Italy but also the U.S. His works have been shown in solo and group shows featuring a range from abstract impressionism to pop art. According to New York Times reviewer Edward Zimmer, Giobbi's early works reveal the influence of expressionism. These works depict a "dark sense of ambiguity and longing" contradicted by "buoyant" colors. "Mr. Giobbi's art then takes a different turn... more intellectual and formal", revealing the impact of cubism and formalism.

Zimmer notes Giobbi's use of a protagonist, Linus, addressing issues of loss and abandonment. See the article "In Katonah with Nothing But Abstractions to Consider" by Vivien Raynor, New York Times, July 19, 1992, and Giobbi's response, "The Myth of Linus in Greek Mythology" New York Times, September 16, 1992.

Giobbi's later works are autobiographical, with a "free, seemingly extemporaneous use of paint that contrasts with the deliberately plotted quality of the main compositions."

== Early life and World War II ==
Edward Giobbi was born in Waterbury, Connecticut on July 18, 1926. He served in the U.S. Army, European Theatre, during World War II, participating in the final push through Nazi Germany, having been deployed in 1945 to reinforce American units after "The Battle of The Bulge" or "Operation: Watch on The Rhine".

== Education ==
In his article, "Still Going Strong", New York Times, September 9, 2001, D. Dominick Lombardi wrote:

"After returning from the service in 1946, Giobbi worked in a foundry, earning enough money to begin his art education at Vesper George School of Art in Boston."

A visiting artist there, Henry Hensche, suggested that Giobbi spend the summer at Hensche's private art school in Provincetown, Mass.

"He taught the Impressionist style, which is when I learned color logic, whereby all colors fit as they do in nature," Giobbi said. "This enabled me to build a color vocabulary that I continue to use today."

After he finished school in Boston, Giobbi moved on to the Art Students League in Manhattan. "The League was fabulous in 1949," he said. "It was full of veterans who were no-nonsense. They had families, they experienced war, and there was no time for fussing around."

"Shortly afterwards, my mother suggested I visit Italy. I stayed for three years, learned to speak better Italian and studied fresco painting at the Academia di Belle Arte in Florence. I learned the old master techniques using dried pigments with rabbit skin glue. That is when I fell in love with the early fresco artists: Giotto, Masaccio, Piero della Francesca and Michelangelo. Those are the people that still nourish me through their art."

== Career ==
Giobbi was the author of "Italian Family Cooking" (1971) and "Eat Right, Eat Well—The Italian Way" (1985). The second book was edited by noted cookbook editor Judith Jones and reflects Giobbi's back to nature lifestyle in imitation of his Italian ancestors who raised their own farm animals and grew their own vegetables and fruits. For "Pleasures of the Good Earth" (1991), Giobbi won a James Beard Foundation Award for culinary excellence in 1992. Giobbi collaborated with his daughter, Eugenia Giobbi Bone, for his most recent work, "Italian Family Dining: Recipes, Menus and Memories of Meals with a Great American Food Family" (2005)/ In 1990, he was elected into the National Academy of Design as an Associate member, and became a full Academician in 1992.

His oral history interview, recorded by Paul Cummings in November and December 1977, is archived at the Smithsonian Institution Archives of American Art.

See also "An Artist Round When All Was Square", review of a Katonah Gallery show, New York Times, July 2, 1976.

Giobbi's work is held in the permanent collection of the Whitney Museum of American Art, the National Gallery of Art, Australia, the Tate Museum, London, the Art Institute of Chicago, among other institutions.

== Personal life and death ==
In speaking of his return to New York City in 1954, he said: "I had a special grant from the Art Students League, affording me time and space in the sculpture studio. I met my wife, Elinor Turner, there. In 1958, we decided to return to Europe. We got married in Switzerland."

Returning to the Northeast in 1961, the Giobbis stayed in a friend's home in Greenwich, searching the tristate area for a home before settling in Katonah.

"I found Munch, Cézanne, Matisse, Picasso and Giacometti to be artists that nourished me," he said, recalling influences on his work at that time. "In those days, Abstract Expressionism was in full swing. I liked the excitement and the abandonment of their technique to a degree, but I do not believe in anarchy. If you look at the growth of masses of various vegetation that grows naturally in the woods, you see extreme anarchy. However, if you really study this vegetation, there is order there. That is how I see painting. The Abstract Expressionists lacked order."

Giobbi's daughter Eugenia Bone is a food and nature writer, as well as a chef and amateur mycologist.

Giobbi died at home in Katonah, on May 9, 2026, at the age of 99.
