= Forest Lodge (Upton, Maine) =

- U.S. National Register of Historic Places
- U.S. Historic district
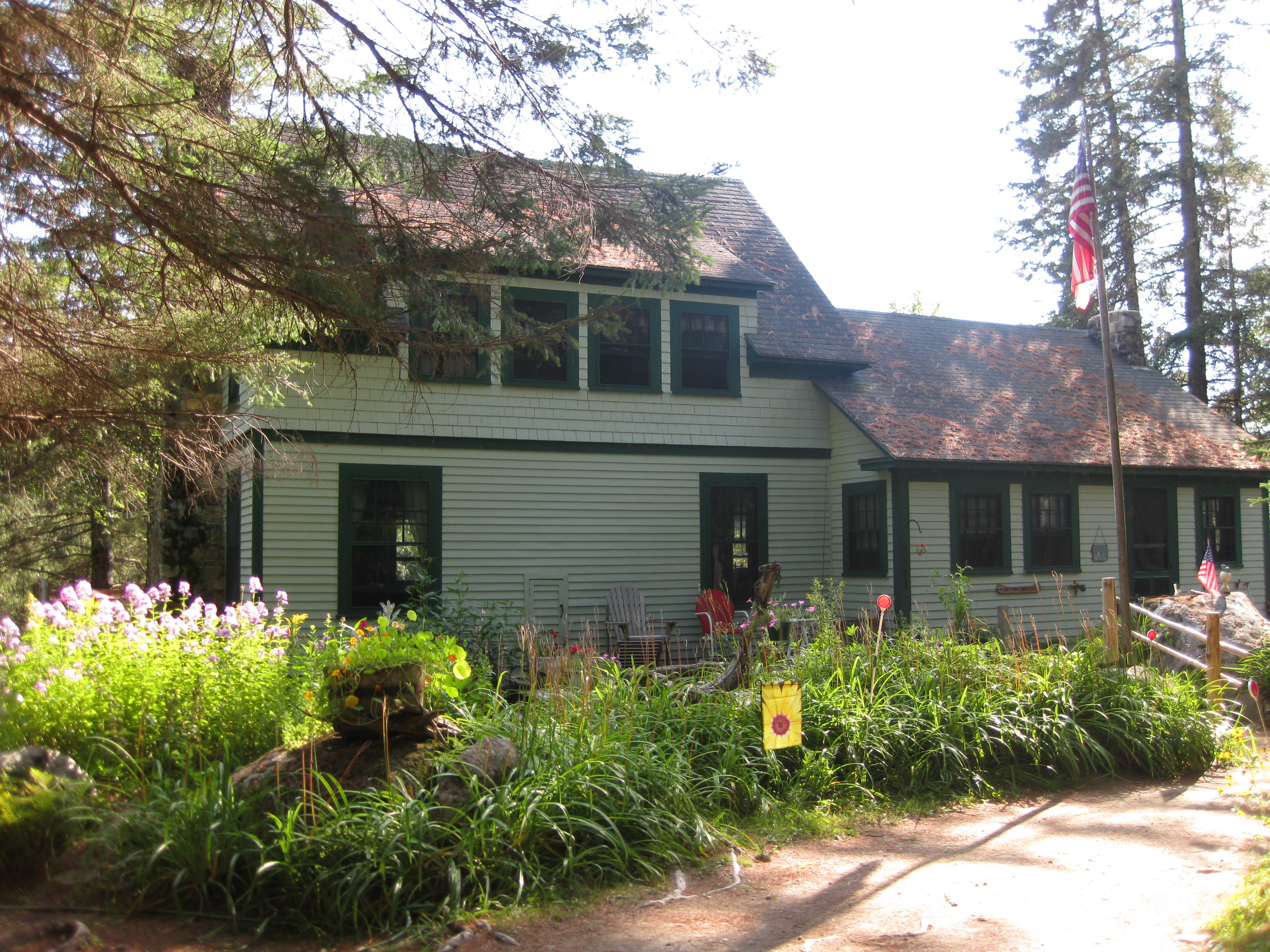

- Location within Maine Location within the United States
- Location: Carry Rd., about 1.9 mi. W. of Middle Dam, Upton, Maine
- Coordinates: 44°46′0″N 70°57′1″W
- Area: 1.8 acres (0.73 ha)
- Built: 1942
- Architectural style: Late Victorian, camp
- NRHP reference No.: 08001257
- Added to NRHP: December 30, 2008

Forest Lodge is a historic homestead in rural northern Oxford County, Maine. Lying in a hard-to-reach corner of Upton, on the northern bank of the Rapid River, it comprises seven buildings, four of which are residential. The complex was owned and occupied by the family of writer Louise Dickinson Rich (1903–1991) year round from 1933 to 1944, and as Rich's summer home until 1955. The property, the surrounding country, and its small number of year-round residents and seasonal visitors were recurring motifs in her writings, which spanned forty years. Her book We Took to the Woods (1942) is about her first six years there. The property was added to the National Register of Historic Places in 2008.

== Description and history ==
Forest Lodge occupies a roughly triangular parcel of land of 1.8 acres (0.73 ha), on the north bank of the Rapid River. Although within the municipal bounds of Upton, it is isolated from the rest of the town, requiring a lengthy drive through one of the adjacent counties to reach the Carry Road, which passes through the property. The main complex of buildings is on a loop road south of Carry Road, which runs closer to the river.

The complex includes a variety of buildings built at different times. The oldest buildings, of uncertain date, include the Winter House, the Summer House, and the Guide House, all of which were extant in 1933, when Ralph Rich moved to the property. That summer, he met Louise Dickinson and her sister, who were canoeing on the river and stopped at the camp during the lengthy portage between Lower Richardson Lake and Lake Umbagog. Louise moved in during the following year, and the couple adapted the seasonal camp for year-round living, producing two children before Ralph's death in 1944. Louise took up writing to supplement the family income, publishing her best-known work, We Took to The Woods, in 1942. This book is an autobiographical account of living and working in the Maine woods, and has become an iconic work of regional writing. After her husband's death, Louise Rich wintered on the Maine coast and lived at Forest Lodge in the summers. In 1955 she sold the property to a relative of one of her long-time local workers, and the property has remained in sympathetic hands since then. In 2014, part of the property was for sale, with the idea to turn the rest into a memorial to Rich.

The Winter House is a one-story rectangular wooden structure, about 20 by 25 feet (6.1 m × 7.6 m), finished in clapboards. Its main façade faces east, and is sheltered by a hip-roofed porch supported by log posts. The interior is divided into two sections, the southern having two bedrooms, and the northern a large living space. The northern space has a pine floor, wainscoting, and a brick fireplace.

The Summer House, the largest building in the complex, is nearly twice the size of the Winter House. Its main block, almost as large as the Winter House, rests on a concrete foundation, which is exposed because the terrain slopes; a slightly smaller ell is attached to the west. A porch extends across the full length of the southern elevation. This building still houses some of Rich's furniture and working materials, including a typewriter and a rolltop desk.

The Guide's House is a small wood frame structure measuring 20 by 16 feet (6.1 m × 4.9 m) with a side-gable asphalt roof. It is divided into two sleeping chambers, has no plumbing or electricity, and was used by the Riches as housing for seasonal workers on the property.

Of the other buildings on the property, two woodsheds and a workshop were built by the Riches. The other structures, including the Guest House and Fly Shop, are additions by later owners.

== See also ==
- National Register of Historic Places listings in Oxford County, Maine
