= Helen Nearing =

Co-author of The Good Life

Helen Knothe Nearing
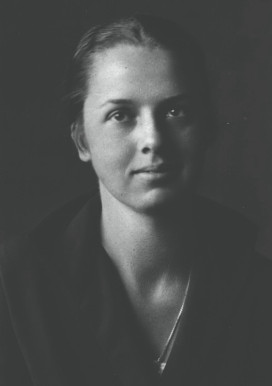
- Nearing in the 1920s
- Born: Helen Knothe; February 23, 1904; Ridgewood, New Jersey, U.S.
- Died: September 17, 1995 (aged 91); Harborside, Maine, U.S.
- Occupations: Author, simple living advocate
- Spouse: Scott Nearing (1947-1983)

Helen Knothe Nearing (February 23, 1904 – September 17, 1995) was an American author, advocate of simple living and a lifelong vegetarian.

== Biography ==
Helen Knothe was born on February 23, 1904, in Ridgewood, New Jersey, the daughter of Frank Knothe, who had a clothing business. She grew up in an economically comfortable family of theosophists and was a lifelong vegetarian. She graduated from Ridgewood High School and studied the violin internationally. As a young woman, she had a romantic relationship with Jiddu Krishnamurti.

She and Scott Nearing started a relationship in 1928 and were married by a Unitarian minister while visiting Los Angeles, California, nearly 20 years later, on December 12, 1947, when she was 43 and he was 64. In 1934, the couple left New York City for Winhall in rural Vermont, where they had purchased a rather large forest tract for $2200 and a moderate-sized farm for $2500. They aspired to live a more "purposeful" life and improve their health while disassociating from modern society. At the homestead, they lived a largely ascetic and self-reliant life, growing much of their own food and putting up nine stone buildings over the course of two decades. They earned money from producing maple syrup and maple sugar from the trees on their land and from Scott's occasional paid lectures. In her book Meanwhile, Next Door to the Good Life, Jean Hay Bright said that the Nearings were both subsidized by inheritances that supported their forest farm. In 1934, around the time they purchased the Vermont property, Helen inherited between $30,000–$40,000 from former suitor J. J. van der Leeuw. Louis Nearing’s six children, including Scott, split the inheritance from the sale of their father's estate. “I’m sure it was one million bucks” in 1947, Scott's son Robert said of the estate's value. Scott's inheritance would have been well into six figures. “Scott kept his share to write a book.” He remembered his Aunt Dorothy commenting that Scott’s “writing a book was the last thing Papa would want” to have happen with his money.

== Organic farming ==
Helen and Scott Nearing left the Vermont homestead in 1952 after the area saw an increase in ski tourism, moving to a homestead in Brooksville, Maine, on Cape Rosier, where they continued growing much of their own food using organic farming practices. They cultivated blueberries as a cash crop. In 1954, the couple published Living the Good Life which inspired many young educated Americans, and others in countries like Australia, to endeavour to create simpler, more self-sufficient rural lifestyles and the back-to-the-land movement of the 1960s and 70s. In 1994, Mother Earth News called Nearing the "mother of the back to the land movement." The magazine did first interview Nearing in 1971.

== Vegetarianism ==
Nearing was a speaker at the World Vegetarian Congress held in Sweden in 1973 and in Orono, Maine, in 1975 and hosted by the International Vegetarian Union.

In 1980, Nearing published her vegetarian cookbook Simple Food for the Good Life. In 2016, 20 years after her death, the Portland Press Herald reported: "The book, which is still in print, contains the ultra-simple recipes for which she was known (such as Simple Celery Soup, made with celery, oil, one potato, water, salt and nutmeg). It was here she famously called herself "a far-from-enthusiastic and qualified cook.""

In the summer of 1991, Helen and Scott were inducted into the Vegetarian Hall of Fame of the North American Vegetarian Society.

== Death ==
Helen Nearing died in 1995 as the result of a single-car accident in Harborside, Maine.

== Legacy and Good Life Center ==
The Maine estate was left for The Trust for Public Land which established the Good Life Center to continue the Nearings' legacy. The resident stewards who live on site must maintain a vegetarian diet on the property. The resident steward position has drawn participants from across the country and others have cited Nearing as inspiration for starting their own homesteads. The Thoreau Institute acquired the papers of the couple.

== Published works ==
- The Good Life Picture Album (1974)
- Simple Food for the Good Life (1980)
- Wise Words for the Good Life (1980)
- Our Home Made of Stone (1983)
- Loving and Leaving the Good Life (1992)
- Light on Aging and Dying (1995)

Co-authored with Scott Nearing

- The Maple Sugar Book: being a plain practical account of the Art of Sugaring designed to promote an acquaintance with the Ancient as well as the Modern practise, together with remarks on Pioneering as a way of living in the twentieth century. New York: John Day Co., 1950.
- Living the Good Life (1954) ISBN 0-88365-236-6
- Socialists Around the World (1958)
- Building and Using Our Sun-Heated Greenhouse (1977)
- Continuing the Good Life (1979)
- The Good Life (1989)
