= Subsistence economy =

Economy directed to basic subsistence

A subsistence economy is an economy directed to basic subsistence (the provision of sufficient food, clothing and shelter to sustain life) rather than oriented to sustaining a market in essential and desirable assets.

== Definition ==
"Subsistence" is understood as supporting oneself and one's family at a minimum level. Basic subsistence is the provision of food, clothing, and shelter. A subsistence economy is an economy directed to one's subsistence rather than to the market. Often, the subsistence economy is moneyless and relies on natural resources to provide for basic needs through hunting, gathering, and agriculture. In a subsistence economy, economic surplus is minimal and only used to trade for basic goods, and there is no industrialization. In hunting and gathering societies, resources are often, if not typically, underused.

The subsistence system is maintained through sharing, feasting, ritual observance, and associated norms. Harvesting is an important indicator of social capital. Subsistence embodies cultural perspectives of relationships to places, people and animals.

== History ==
In human history, before the first cities, all humans lived in a subsistence economy. As urbanization, civilization, and division of labor spread, various societies moved to other economic systems at various times. Some remain relatively unchanged, ranging from uncontacted peoples to marginalized areas of developing countries, as well as to some cultures that choose to retain a traditional economy.

== List of strategies ==
- Hunting and gathering techniques, also known as foraging:
  - Artisan fishing — a term which particularly applies to coastal or island ethnic groups using traditional techniques for subsistence fishing.
  - Aboriginal whaling, including the subsistence hunting of the bowhead whale in the Arctic.
- Agriculture:
  - Subsistence agriculture — agricultural cultivation involving continuous use of arable (crop) land, and is more labor-intensive than horticulture.
  - Horticulture — plant cultivation, based on the use of simple tools.
- Pastoralism, the raising of grazing animals:
  - Pastoral nomadism — all members of the pastoral society follow the herd throughout the year.
  - Transhumance or agro-pastoralism — part of the society follows the herd, while the other part maintains a home village.
  - Ranch agriculture — non-nomadic pastoralism with a defined territory.
- Distribution and exchange:
  - Redistribution
  - Reciprocity — exchange between social equals.
  - Potlatching — a widely studied ritual in which sponsors (helped by their entourages) gave away resources and manufactured wealth while generating prestige for themselves.
  - LETS — Local Exchange Trading Systems.
- A parasitical society, subsisting on the produce of a separate host society:
  - Raiding
  - Conquest
  - Garbage picking, when subsisting in a larger economy

== See also ==
- Amish
- Anthropological theories of value
- Back-to-the-land movement
- Lasse Nordlund
- Mahatma Gandhi
- Natural economy
- Poverty
- Shakers
- Simple living
- Staple food
- Society
- Subsistence crisis
- Tiny house movement
