= Lois Long (mycologist) =

American mycologist (1918–2005)

- Born: 1918
- Died: 2005 (aged 86–87)
- Occupations: Amateur mycologist, illustrator

Lois Long (1918 – 2005) was an American amateur mycologist, best known for her illustrations and textile designs featuring mushrooms and other forms of nature.

== Biography ==
Long's passion for mushrooms and the science of mycology began when she moved to Rockland County, New York in the 1950s, and a friend introduced her to John Cage, the noted composer poet, artist and avid amateur mycologist. Together they began by exploring the fungi at the New York Botanical Gardens, and meeting with another amateur mycologist Guy Nearing. Eventually, Cage and Nearing helped establish the New York Mycological Society with Long as one of the original 26 founding members.

=== Works ===
Long's works of art have been sold at auction; her first auctioned piece was sold by Christie's New York in 2009. Her work has also been featured in publications including The Guardian and ArtDaily (February 2020) describing an exhibition at Somerset House in London, exploring "the fascinating world of mushrooms."

The two books that are most-often cited as examples of her work are two limited edition books (Mushroom Book and Mud Book), authored by Cage and co-authored by Long and featuring her illustrations. Today, the books can be found in major museums, libraries and private collections, including the British Museum in London and MOMA in New York. One exhibitor's review of the Mud Book describes it favorably, saying, "The edition is an outstanding example of silkscreen printing. Its extraordinary quality was accomplished by employing up to sixty-nine (69) screens for a single page, achieving a startling luminosity of color and distinctness of line and form."

To explore mushrooms around the world, Long was known to have taken trips abroad to Mexico, China, Japan, Madagascar and India.

Her artistic illustrations were praised for featuring of the kind of earth in which the fungi were found. Her obituary mentions, "Precise in color and detail, they are accurate enough to be used for research and yet the drawings are also an aesthetic success, expressed in simplicity of line and composition and uniquely rendered in watercolor and graphite."

At her last in-person exhibition at the Cavin-Morris Gallery in 2003, Long exhibited "life-sized mushroom drawings in watercolor and graphite and sculpture in paper mache."

=== Posthumous tribute ===
In 2015, her illustrations were part of an exhibition at the Hunt Institute for Botanical Documentation at Carnegie Mellon University in Pittsburgh. According to the exhibit's literature,

"The example exhibited includes the outside of folder 10 with Cage’s word drawings overlapping a drawn overview of the artist Lois Long’s property where they would often hunt for morels; a tissue overlay of text, of his and others prose, over a lithograph of morel mushrooms by Lois Long. Cage wanted the search for words and meaning to simulate the experience of foraging in the woods for mushrooms. He compared the role of chance in finding mushrooms to the chance that occurred while creating music and art."

== Selected publications ==
- Cage, John, et al. Atlas eclipticalis. 1962.
- Cage, John, Lois Long, and Alexander H. Smith. Mushroom Book. New York: Hollanders Workshop, 1972.
- Cage, John, and Lois Long. Mud Book: How to Make Pies and Cakes. Hudson, New York: Princeton Architectural Press, 2017.
