= New Commonwealth Society =

The New Commonwealth was an international organisation created in London in 1932 with branches in France, Germany and the United States. It advocated pacifism, disarmament and multilateral resolution of conflicts through political lobbying and a variety of publications. Unlike similar organisations, the German branch of the New Commonwealth Society was allowed to promote its ideas and continue its activities in Nazi Germany until it was dissolved in mid-1938.

The Society advocated the creation of an international court and an international police force, thus distinguishing itself from the two most influential components of the interwar peace movement: the pacifists who opposed any use of force in international relations, and the "internationalist" supporters of the League of Nations.

Notable members of the organisation include its founder, Lord Davies, Winston Churchill and George Barnes, and eminent scholars such as Albert Einstein, Otto Neurath, Hans Kelsen and Alfred Verdross.

== Composition and organisation ==
The New Commonwealth Society was created in October 1932 in London by David Davies (Lord Davies of Llandinam), a British liberal millionaire and former secretary to the liberal politician Lloyd George. Its patrons included prominent politicians such Lord Gladstone, Lord Robert Cecil, Winston Churchill and Clement Attlee. Its inaugural executive committee consisted of Davies and one member from each of the larger national branches: former leader of the Labour party George Barnes for Britain, journalist Henry de Jouvenel for France, liberal activist Ernst Jäckh for Germany, and businessman Oscar Terry Crosby for the United States.

Notable members also included Eyvind Bratt from Sweden, J. J. van der Leeuw from the Netherlands, and distinguished academic scholars such as the émigré Albert Einstein, Norman Bentwich, Nicholas Murray Butler, George Scelle, Hans Kelsen, Alfred Verdross, who founded the Austrian branch in 1937, and Otto Neurath.

The German branch, led by SA-Gruppenführer Friedrich Haselmayr, was unique in that its activities were tolerated and occasionally even encouraged by the Nazi regime. Unlike similar organisations, it was allowed to promote its ideas and continue operating until its dissolution in mid-1938.

== Views on international politics and law ==
The New Commonwealth Society challenged the prevailing notion of absolute national sovereignty, arguing that it was a major obstacle to the prevention of war. They believed that only a supranational authority with the power to limit national sovereignty could effectively prevent international conflicts. To this end, they advocated the creation of an impartial international tribunal and an overwhelming military force that would enforce the rulings of the tribunal.

While in exile in Geneva, Hans Kelsen played a key role in shaping the New Commonwealth Society's views on international law. As a member of the board of its research institute, he wrote The Legal Process and International Order (1935), which was the first monograph published by the New Commonwealth Research Bureau. There he stressed the importance of international tribunals in creating new laws where existing ones were inadequate, and argued that the elimination of war could only be achieved through the establishment of an international executive power capable of enforcing the judgments of an international court. In 1934, the New Commonwealth Society's Preliminary Opinion on the Tribunal echoed Kelsen's views on the role of international tribunals.

In June 1936, Davies passionately urged Churchill to take a leading role in the New Commonwealth Society and use it to save Europe from the looming catastrophe. According to Roy Jenkins, Churchill responded "with an enthusiasm which was only slightly wary." In a speech to the Society in May 1937, Churchill said

We are one of the few peace societies that advocates the use of force, if possible overwhelming force, to support public international law.

Some of the ideas of the New Commonwealth Society were later incorporated into the United Nations Charter.

== Publications ==
To promote its aims, the Society published a monthly, The New Commonwealth, from 1932 to 1950. It also published a quarterly from 1935 to 1943, first named New Commonwealth Quarterly, later renamed the London Quarterly of World Affairs. Otto Neurath was a member of the editorial committee.

The Society also published many pamphlets and books.

== Bibliography ==
- Ashkenazi, Ofer (2018-02-26). "Transnational Anti-war Activity in the Third Reich: The Nazi Branch of the New Commonwealth Society*". German History. 36 (2). Oxford University Press (OUP): 207–228. doi:10.1093/gerhis/ghy004. ISSN 0266-3554.
- Jenkins, Roy (2012-12-13). Churchill. Pan Macmillan. ISBN 978-0-330-47607-2.
- Ploß, Christoph Johannes (2017). Die "New Commonwealth Society". Ein Ideen-Laboratorium für den supranationalen europäischen Integrationsprozess [The New Commonwealth Society. A laboratory of ideas for the supranational European integration process] (in German). Stuttgart: Franz Steiner Verlag. ISBN 978-3-515-11799-9.
- Pugh, Michael C. (1988). "An International Police Force: Lord Davies and the British Debate in the 1930s". International Relations. 9 (4). SAGE Publications: 335–351. doi:10.1177/004711788800900405. ISSN 0047-1178.
