= Lasse Nordlund =

Finnish social thinker

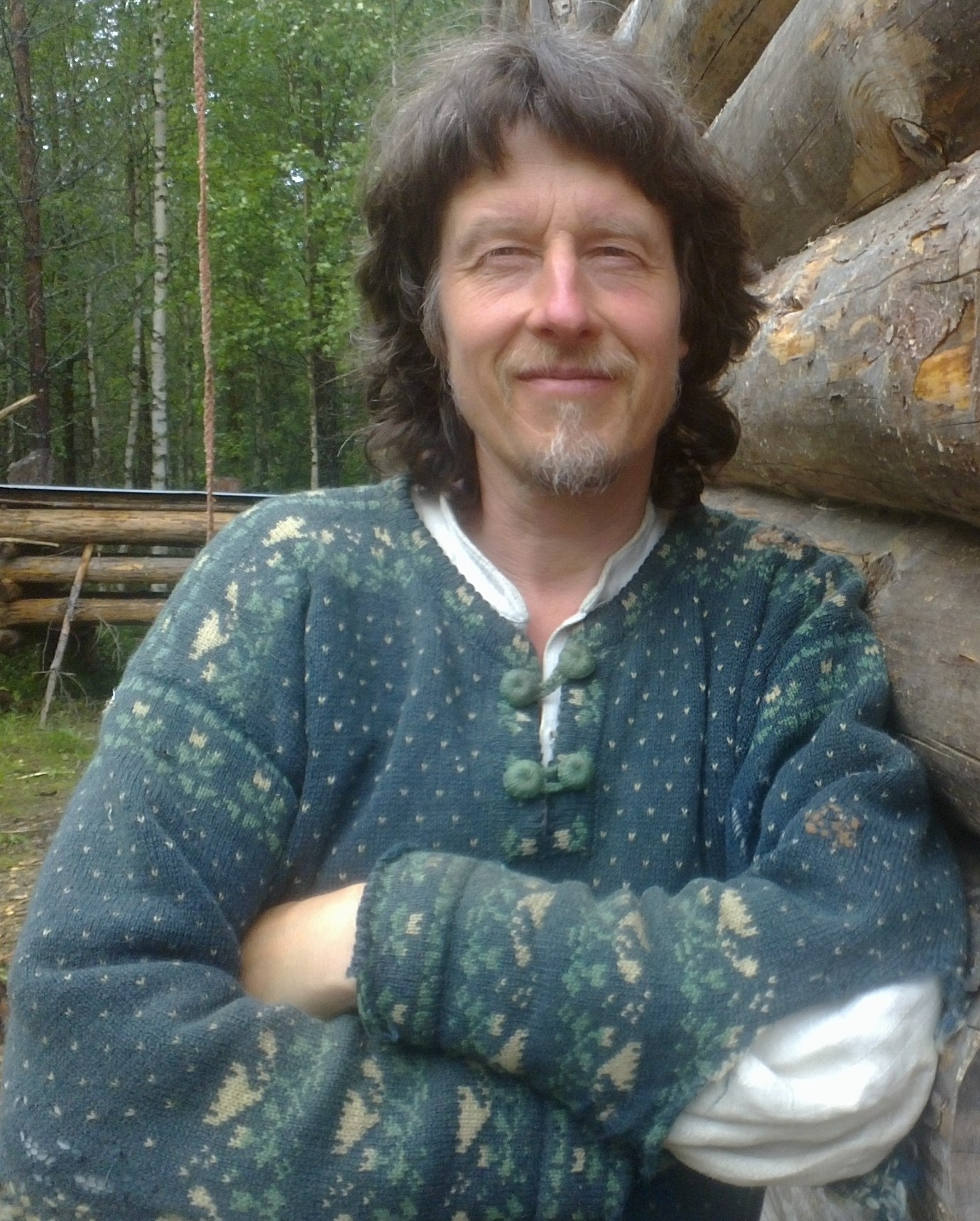
Lasse Nordlund summer 2016

Lasse Nordlund (1965) is a Finnish social thinker who is known for his experiment of living completely self-sufficiently in the Finnish countryside, producing his clothes and tools and cultivating his food from his small farm and what he gathered from the surrounding country.

== History ==
Born in Helsinki to a Finnish father and a German mother, Nordlund spent a typical youth in Germany and was interested in studying physics. However, he began to doubt the viability and meaning of conventional living and decided to try to live a self-sufficient lifestyle.

The background to Nordlund's experiment is his conviction that only subsistence living is materially sustainable on a long-term basis.

== The Experiment ==
Nordlund could not, by his own admission, distinguish between a pine or a fir tree when he started his project, but started by studying books and experimenting to produce goods and obtain food. Eventually, he was able to live in Valtimo, in Finnish North Karelia, for the years between 1992 and 2004 in complete self-sufficiency.

According to Nordlund, one person needs about five ares (500 m^{2}) of farmland to live on without buying any additional food. The most important food crop for him is the rutabaga, a common Finnish staple. In his self-sufficient economy, Nordlund consumes 200 kg of mushrooms per year and about the same in berries preserved without additives or sugar. He forsook livestock because he projected the maintenance (for example, animal feed) to be too time-consuming to make sense. Though he does accept the value of animal husbandry as wool and leather are handy clothing materials able to outlast cotton cloth. Nordlund became accustomed to life without salt, though many believe it to be life-threatening. He argues that he has been able to live without salt for years, although initially leaving out salt caused him some health issues. Instead of toilet paper, he uses dried sphagnum moss. In the early years of self-reliance, Nordlund's days were full of work, but eventually he was able to relax and take up hobbies from his youth, such as flute playing and working on equations.

== Recent ==
He is an author and a speaker on sustainability topics.

Today, he lives with his family, still mostly self-sufficiently.

In 2008, Palladium books published a work written by Lasse Nordlund and Maria Dorff "The Foundations of Our Life, Reflections about Human labour, Money and Energy from Self-sufficiency Standpoint".

== See also ==
- Back-to-the-land movement
