= Near =

NEAR or Near may refer to:

== People ==
- Thomas J. Near, US evolutionary ichthyologist
- Near (programmer), a developer who created the higan emulator

== Science, mathematics, technology, biology, and medicine ==
- National Emergency Alarm Repeater (NEAR), a former alarm device to warn civilians of a foreign nuclear attack on the United States
- National Emergency Airway Registry (NEAR), a patient registry for intubations in the United States
- Nicking enzyme amplification reaction (NEAR), a method of DNA amplification
- NEAR (blockchain platform), a layer-1 blockchain
- NEAR Shoemaker, a spacecraft that studied the near-Earth asteroid Eros
- Nearness or proximity space
- "Near", a city browser by NearGlobal
- Near space, the upper atmosphere below outer space

== Television, film, music, and books ==
- Near (Death Note), Nate River, a character

== Other uses ==
- Near v. Minnesota, a U.S. press freedom Supreme Court decision
- New England Auto Racers Hall of Fame
