= Eugenia Bone =

American food and nature writer

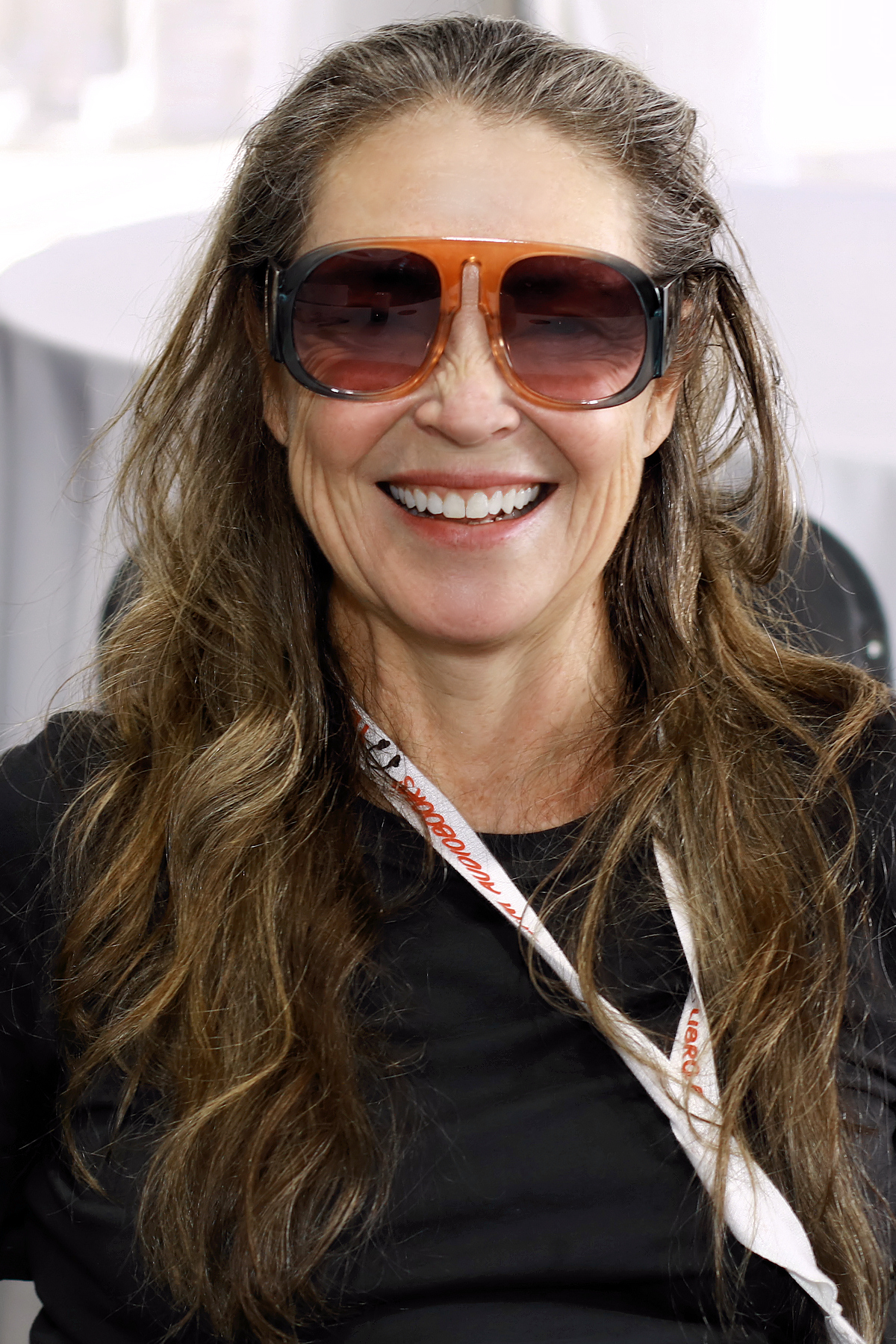
- Bone at the 2024 Texas Book Festival.
- Occupations: Food and nature writer; Chef
- Organizations: New York Mycological Society
- Parent: Edward Giobbi

Eugenia Bone is an American food and nature writer, as well as a chef and amateur mycologist. Her work has appeared in the New York Times, Wall Street Journal, Food & Wine, Saveur and the BBC Science Focus. Bone is the author of numerous books on food and mushrooms.

Bone has taught and lectured at the New York Botanical Garden, Denver Botanical Garden and the New York Public Library. She is the former president of the New York Mycological Society.

== Career ==
Bone has written extensively about fungi and their role within nature, as well as within the health and mental health realms. Bone has published numerous books including Fantastic Fungi Community Cookbook (2021) which includes recipes by wild mushroom foragers, mycologists and chefs specializing in mushroom-based dishes. Many of the contributors were featured in the 2019 documentary film, Fantastic Fungi, by Louie Schwartzberg.

Her book Microbia: A Journey into the Unseen World Around You (2018) covers various microorganisms including endophytic fungi in plants as well as other species that live in the human gut. Her book, Mycophilia: Revelations from the Weird World of Mushrooms (2013) was reviewed in the New York Times and other publications.

Bone has taught and lectured at the New York Botanical Gardens, the Denver Botanical Gardens, the New York Public Library, and the Reuben Museum, among other venues.

She is the former president of the New York Mycological Society.

=== Selected books ===
- Well Preserved: Recipes and techniques for putting up small batches of seasonal foods, (2009), Crown Publishing/Clarkson Potter a division of Random House. ISBN 978-0-307-88580-7
- Mycophilia: Revelations from the Weird World of Mushrooms, (2013), Rodale Press. ISBN 978-1-60961-987-9
- Kitchen Ecosystem: Integrating Recipes to Create Delicious Meals, (2014), Clarkson Potter Press, ISBN 978-0-385-34512-5
- Microbia: A Journey into the Unseen World Around You, (2018), Rodale Press ISBN 978-1-62336-735-0
- Fantastic Fungi Community Cookbook, (2021), Simon & Schuster, ISBN 978-1647222956

=== Awards and honors ===
Bone's 2009 book, Well Preserved: Recipes and techniques for putting up small batches of seasonal foods was nominated for a James Beard Award. Her 2021 book, Fantastic Fungi Community Cookbook won the Nautilus Silver Medal Award for food, cooking and healthy living.

== Personal life ==
Bone spent her youth in New York City. Her father, Edward Giobbi is of Italian heritage and was a James Beard Award-winning chef. She met her husband, Kevin, in Colorado Springs. Bone lives in Colorado and New York City.
