= Living the Good Life =

1954 book by Helen and Scott Nearing

- Title page for Living the Good Life (1954)
- Author: Helen and Scott Nearing
- Subject: Homesteading
- Publication date: 1954

Living the Good Life is a book by Helen and Scott Nearing about their self-sufficient homesteading project in Vermont. It was originally published privately in 1954 and was republished in 1970 with Schocken Books and an introduction by Paul Goodman.

== Background ==
Scott Nearing, an outspoken leftist and economist, began homesteading in Vermont with his wife, Helen Nearing, after he had been blacklisted by the academic community for his political beliefs. The book advocates vegetarianism. Scott Nearing became a vegetarian in 1917, and Helen Nearing was a lifelong vegetarian. The book explains how they sought "an alternative to western civilization and its outmoded culture pattern." It also said "that all life is to be respected — non-human as well as human."

== Publication ==
After the Nearings published a book in 1950 about their use of maple syrup as a seasonal cash crop, Pearl S. Buck, the wife of their editor, encouraged the Nearings to write a book about their homesteading life. By the time they finished the manuscript several years later, the publisher was no longer interested. The Nearings created their own imprint, Social Science Institute, and self-published the book in 1954. Its original printing of 2,000 electrotyped copies sold poorly.

During the 1960s, back-to-the-land books entered higher demand, as advertised through the Whole Earth Catalog. The Nearings had moved to Maine but continued to homestead. Schocken Books republished Living the Good Life from the original plates and with a foreword from Paul Goodman. The book sold 50,000 copies its first year, and became seminal in the late-20th-century American back-to-the-land movement, putting the Nearings in the national spotlight. The book would sell 170,000 copies and receive translation into five languages. The Nearings gave their royalties to their Social Science Institute.

A 1979 documentary film by the same name showed the Nearings tending to their homestead and discussing their philosophy. A follow-up book, Continuing the Good Life, was also published in 1979.

== Legacy ==
In 1995, The New York Times wrote that Living the Good Life remained "a modern day Walden" for those who tired of the city.
