= New York Mycological Society =

US nonprofit organization

- Formation: 1962
- Founder: John Cage, Lois Long, and Guy Nearing
- Location: New York City
- Members: 1,500 (2022)
- Key people: Current president: Ethan Crenson; Past presidents: Gary Lincoff, Eugenia Bone
- Website: www.newyorkmyc.org

The New York Mycological Society is a nonprofit organization of people who share an interest in mycology. The present NYMS was reincarnated in 1962 by the composer John Cage and a small group of other mushroom lovers and students, including illustrator Lois Long and noted mycologist Guy Nearing.

The NYMS runs events and mushrooming walks throughout the greater NYC area. The society originated in a class at The New School in 1959.
