= Louise Dickinson Rich =

American writer

Louise Dickinson Rich (14 June 1903 – 9 April 1991) was a writer known for fiction and non-fiction works about the New England region of the United States, particularly Massachusetts and Maine. Her best-known work was her first book, the autobiographical We Took to the Woods (1942), set in the 1930s when she and husband Ralph, and her friend and hired help Gerrish, lived in a remote cabin near Umbagog Lake. It was described as "a witty account of a Thoreau-like existence in a wilderness home."

== Early life ==
Sarah Louise was born in Huntington, Massachusetts, and grew up in Bridgewater, where her father was the editor of the weekly newspaper the Independent. She writes about growing up in Bridgewater, with her parents and her younger sister Alice Eldora, in "Innocence Under the Elms" (1955). Rich received a B.S. from Massachusetts State Teacher's College in 1924.

== Marriage and family ==
Louise first married John Davis Bacon, on November 24, 1926, described by a friend as "rather much of a playboy. By that I mean, I don't think he worked very hard at anything." She filed for divorce on March 18, 1931.

While on a canoe trip with a girlfriend in Maine, she met Ralph Eugene Rich, a Chicago businessman who had recently "returned to the land". They married a year later. The Riches lived on the Rapid River in rural Oxford County and split seasons between the Summer House, a large but poorly insulated home perched on the banks of the Rapid River, and the smaller but warmer Winter House, just a few steps away. She gave birth to her son Rufus in April 1936, and six years later, her daughter Dinah. After Ralph's unexpected death in 1945, Louise and the children moved back to her hometown of Bridgewater, Massachusetts.

Louise died of congestive heart failure at her daughter's home in Mattapoisett, Massachusetts. She was 87 years old.

== Bibliography ==
Rich wrote a number of books for adults and children.

=== Autobiographies ===
- We Took to the Woods, J. B. Lippincott Company, Philadelphia/New York (1942)
- Happy the Land, (1946)
- My Neck of the Woods, (1950)
- Only Parent, (1953)
- Innocence Under the Elms, (1955)
- The Natural World of Louise Dickinson Rich, (1962)

=== Nature and history ===
- The Coast of Maine, (1956)
- The Peninsula, (1958)
- First Book of The Early Settlers, (1959)
- First Book of New World Explorers, (1960)
- First Book of The Vikings, (1962)
- First Book of The China Clippers, (1962)
- State O' Maine, (1964)
- First Book of The Fur Trade, (1965)
- First Book of Lumbering, (1967)
- The Kennebec River, (1967)
- King Philip's War 1675–76: The New England Indians Fight the Colonists, (1972)

=== Novels ===
- Start of the Trail: the Story of a Young Maine Guide, (1949)
- Trail to the North: A Bill Gordon Story, (1952)
- Mindy, (1959)
- Star Island Boy, (1968)
- Three of A Kind, (1970) – also published as Sally
- Summer at High Kingdom, (1975)

=== Interviews and articles ===
- LDR interviewed on "This I Believe"
- Alice Arlen's biography on Louise Dickinson Rich ("She Took to the Woods") includes a section that shares many of Rich's essays and stories – which were published in magazines but never appeared in book form – as well as excerpts from her journal and letters.
