= Guy Nearing =

American rhododendron and mycologist (1890 - 1986)

George Guy Nearing
- Born: January 22, 1890; Morris Run, USA
- Died: March 10, 1986 (aged 96); Troy, USA
- Citizenship: American
- Known for: Rhododendron breeding; lichenology

Guy Nearing (1890 - 1986) is described as a polymath. He was known for rhododendron breeding, mycology (especially lichens), magazine publishing and advertising, poetry and American folk dancing.

George Guy Nearing was born 22 January 1890 into a wealthy family with 3 sisters and 2 brothers, one of whom was the controversial economist Scott Nearing. He was interested in natural history during his childhood. He attended University of Pennsylvania from 1911, and became blind in his fourth (senior) year. His mother read assignments for him and he managed to graduate but despite some vision returning, he could not continue in academia. He began to work in magazine publishing (including with Mentor Magazine and Harper's Bazaar). He then joined the army but had to leave when he completely lost his sight in one eye. He began working as a publicity agent in 1918, but contracted tuberculosis. He then built a house himself and recovered from the tuberculosis. He returned to work in advertising. He was innovative and successful at this, but was given medical advice that he needed to work out-doors.

== Rhododendrons and other horticulture ==
In 1928 he opened a plant nursery in Arden, Delaware, and developed expertise in hollies. In 1929 he combined his nursery with the Guyencourt Nurseries owned by William E. and Mary N.R. Phelps. The business propagated and sold trees, shrubs, and perennials. They began to develop new hybrid varieties of rhododendron. Nearing developed and patented a type of propagating frame for rooting rhododendrons that was so effective it continued to be used for them and some other woody perennial plants into the 21st century. It allowed cuttings to be rooted, rather than requiring grafting. However, the enterprise collapsed in 1935 in the economic climate of the Great Depression in the United States.

Nearing opened a new nursery in Ridgewood, New Jersey and went into large-scale rhododendron breeding and production, including obtaining new plants from Asia. He developed an international reputation as an authority on rhododendrons. A flood at the nursery in 1945 destroyed many of the plants. Nearing established a third nursery in Ramsey in 1950, again specialising in rhododenrons. He was a member of the American Rhododendron Society plants and was awarded the society's gold medal.

== Fungi and botany ==
Nearing had been interested in fungi from childhood. He was considered one of the most knowledgeable people on the lichens of the north-eastern USA in the 1930s - 1940s. He was an early member of the North American Mycological Association and was also in the Torrey Botanical Club and New York Mycological Society. Through these clubs and societies he met other enthusiasts, and also influenced people, such as Henry Andrew Imshaug and John Walter Thomson to take up lichenology.

Starting in 1941 Nearing put together The Lichen Book: Handbook of the Lichens of Northeastern United States, self-published in 1947 illustrated with his own line drawings. The flood in 1945 partly destroyed both prints and originals so that only a few hundred copies were produced which contained several errors. However, it contained keys to lichen species that allowed multiple access and presented the identification data as a matrix, both styles that were ahead of his time. In contrast, he did not consider chemical tests to be useful for lichen identification.

He became the resident naturalist at Greenbrook Sanctuary on the Hudson River's Palisades from about 1945 until 1950. Nearing also undertook graduate work in botany at Harvard and Columbia universities.

== Other activities ==
Nearing learnt braille, was accomplished at chess, a landscape painter, published five or six volumes of verse, able to use blacksmithing to make ornamental ironwork and was an active member of New Jersey folk dancing societies until his late 80s.

== Publications ==
Nearing was the author or co-author of:

- G. G. Nearing (1947) The Lichen Book: Handbook of the Lichen of Northeastern United States Published N.J. Ridgewood, 648 pp
- G. G. Nearing (1917) The Far Away, Kessinger Publishing pp 62 ISBN 978-1120878830 Fiction novel

== Personal life ==
Nearing was married in the 1920s. He died 19 March 1986 after being in a nursing home for several years.
