= NearGlobal =

London, UK, based software developer

Near
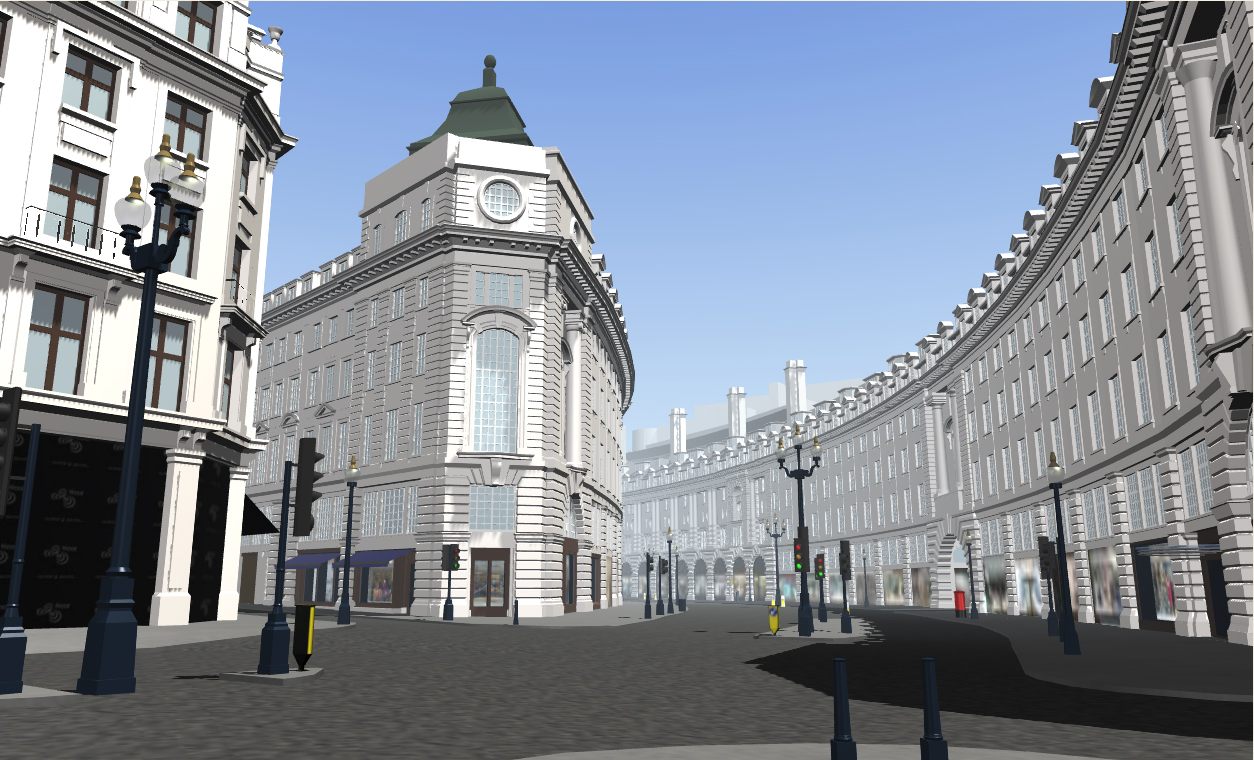
- Regent Street in NearLondon
- Developer(s): Near Global
- Publisher(s): Nearworld Investments
- Platform(s): Windows XP Windows Vista Windows 7
- Release: 7 December 2009 (Open Beta)
- Genre(s): Multiplayer Social Virtual World
- Mode(s): Single player Multiplayer

NearGlobal is a London, based software developer and publisher of Near, a 3D city browser platform and virtual world technology that delivers survey-accurate models of real-world cities that users can explore and interact with from their computer. The Near software was released in December 2009 with a public beta version incorporating the key shopping districts of London's West End.

== Purpose ==
NearGlobal describes the Near product as a discovery platform, rather that a virtual world. Near allows for the seamless integration of existing web-based content into the 3D environment.

== Differentiation ==
Near differs significantly from virtual worlds such as Second Life, Twinity and Blue Mars by focusing more on the presentation of the environment than on its users. The Near software depicts users with blades of light rather than with human avatars.

== See also ==
- Second Life
- Twinity
