= Upton, Maine =

Town in Maine, United States

- Town
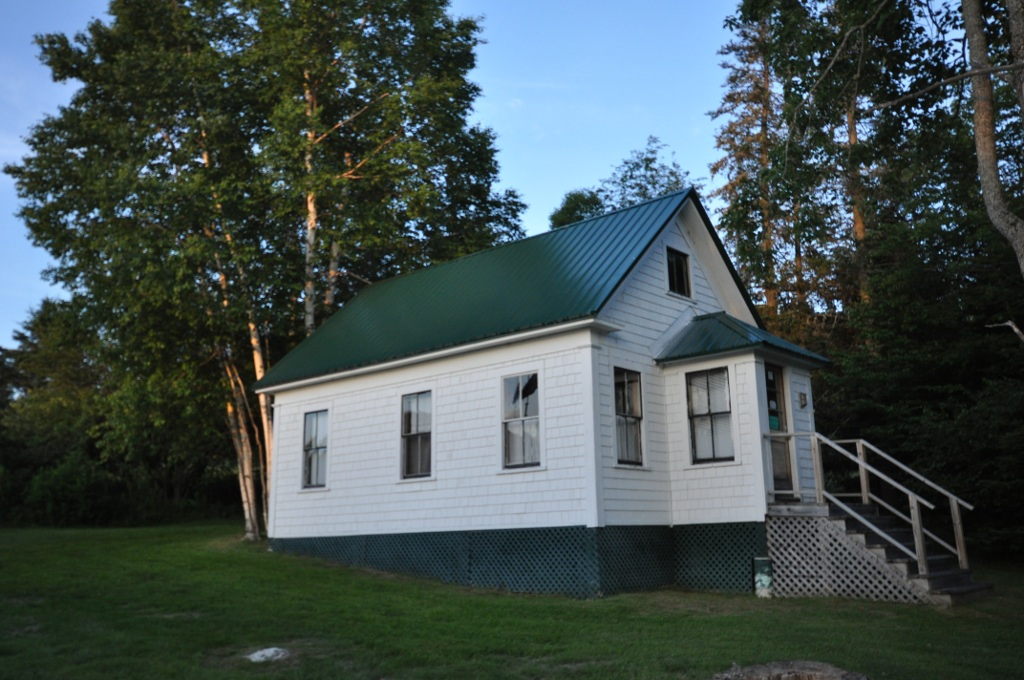
- Upton's public library

- Location within Maine Location within the United States
- Coordinates: 44°43′48″N 70°59′17″W
- Country: United States
- State: Maine
- County: Oxford

Area
  - Total: 41.83 sq mi (108.34 km^{2})
  - Land: 39.51 sq mi (102.33 km^{2})
  - Water: 2.32 sq mi (6.01 km^{2})
- Elevation: 1,398 ft (426 m)

Population (2020)
  - Total: 69
  - Density: 1.8/sq mi (0.7/km^{2})
- Time zone: UTC-5 (Eastern (EST))
  - Summer (DST): UTC-4 (EDT)
- ZIP code: 04261
- Area code: 207
- FIPS code: 23-78465
- GNIS feature ID: 582775

Upton is a town in Oxford County, Maine, United States. The population was 69 at the 2020 census.

== Geography ==
According to the United States Census Bureau, the town has a total area of 41.83 square miles (108.34 km^{2}), of which 39.51 square miles (102.33 km^{2}) is land and 2.32 square miles (6.01 km^{2}) is water.

== Demographics ==
Historical population
Census	Pop.	Note	%±
1860	219		—
1870	187		−14.6%
1880	245		31.0%
1890	232		−5.3%
1900	242		4.3%
1910	306		26.4%
1920	123		−59.8%
1930	166		35.0%
1940	174		4.8%
1950	105		−39.7%
1960	35		−66.7%
1970	54		54.3%
1980	65		20.4%
1990	70		7.7%
2000	62		−11.4%
2010	113		82.3%
2020	69		−38.9%
U.S. Decennial Census

=== 2010 census ===
At the 2010 census there were 113 people, 61 households, and 30 families living in the town. The population density was 2.9 inhabitants per square mile (1.1/km^{2}). There were 199 housing units at an average density of 5.0 per square mile (1.9/km^{2}). The racial makeup of the town was 98.2% White and 1.8% Native American. Of the 61 households 13.1% had children under the age of 18 living with them, 45.9% were married couples living together, 1.6% had a female householder with no husband present, 1.6% had a male householder with no wife present, and 50.8% were non-families. 36.1% of households were one person and 18% were one person aged 65 or older. The average household size was 1.85 and the average family size was 2.40.

The median age in the town was 57.1 years. 10.6% of residents were under the age of 18; 1.8% were between the ages of 18 and 24; 9.8% were from 25 to 44; 48.6% were from 45 to 64; and 29.2% were 65 or older. The gender makeup of the town was 53.1% male and 46.9% female.

=== 2000 census ===
As of the 2000 census, there were 62 people, 33 households, and 20 families living in the town. The population density was 1.6 people per square mile (0.6/km^{2}). There were 173 housing units at an average density of 4.3 per square mile (1.7/km^{2}). The racial makeup of the town was 98.39% White and 1.61% Asian.

Of the 33 households 9.1% had children under the age of 18 living with them, 51.5% were married couples living together, 6.1% had a female householder with no husband present, and 36.4% were non-families. 24.2% of households were one person and 3.0% were one person aged 65 or older. The average household size was 1.88 and the average family size was 2.14.

The age distribution was 6.5% under the age of 18, 1.6% from 18 to 24, 17.7% from 25 to 44, 51.6% from 45 to 64, and 22.6% 65 or older. The median age was 56 years. For every 100 females, there were 106.7 males. For every 100 females age 18 and over, there were 114.8 males.

The median household income was $35,000 and the median family income was $55,625. Males had a median income of $26,250 versus $0 for females. The per capita income for the town was $24,320. There were 19.0% of families and 27.3% of the population living below the poverty line, including no under eighteens and none of those over 64.
