= Vivien Raynor =

American art critic

Vivien Raynor (1927 – February 15, 2009) was an American art critic whose work was published in several publications, including The New York Times, ARTnews, Art in America, and The New Leader. The 2022 Netflix-series The Andy Warhol Diaries mentioned her New York Times review of the September 1985 Warhol-Basquiat exhibition, in which Raynor wrote: “Last year, I wrote of Jean-Michel Basquiat that he had a chance of becoming a very good painter, providing he didn’t succumb to the forces that would make him an art world mascot. This year, it appears that those forces have prevailed.”
