= Harborside, Maine =

- Village
- Location within Maine
- Coordinates: 44°20′56″N 68°48′53″W
- Country: United States
- State: Maine
- County: Hancock
- Town: Brooksville
- Elevation: 89 ft (27 m)
- Time zone: UTC-5 (Eastern (EST))
  - Summer (DST): UTC-4 (EDT)
- ZIP code: 04642
- Area code: 207
- GNIS feature ID: 567596

Harborside is an unincorporated village in the town of Brooksville, Hancock County, Maine, United States. The community is located on the west coast of Cape Rosier, on Penobscot Bay, 24 miles (39 km) southwest of Ellsworth. Harborside had a post office from April 7, 1898, until December 20, 2003; it still has its own ZIP code, 04642.
