= Back-to-the-land movement =

Agrarian movement of former urbanites

A back-to-the-land movement is any of the various agrarian movements across different historical periods. The common thread is a call for people to take up smallholding and to grow food from the land with an emphasis on a greater degree of self-sufficiency, autonomy, and local community than that found in conventional industrial or postindustrial ways of life. Some of the motives behind such movements have included social reform, land reform, and civilian war efforts. Groups involved have included political reformers, counterculture hippies, and religious separatists.

== History ==
The concept was popularized in the United States at the beginning of the 20th century by activist Bolton Hall, who set up vacant lot farming in New York City and wrote many books on the subject; and by his follower Ralph Borsodi, who is known for his practical experiments in self-sufficient living during the 1920s and 1930s.

During World War II, when Great Britain faced a blockade by German U-boats, a "Dig for Victory" campaign urged civilians to fight food shortages by growing vegetables on any available patch of land.

Between the mid-1960s and mid-1970s, the USA had a revived back-to-the-land movement, with substantial numbers of people migrating from cities to rural areas.

The back-to-the-land movement has ideological links to distributism, a 1920s and 1930s attempt to find a "Third Way" between capitalism and socialism.

=== Historical precedents ===
The American social commentator and poet Gary Snyder has related that the many back-to-the-land population movements throughout the centuries, and throughout the world, can be largely attributed to the occurrence of severe urban problems where people felt the need to live a better life or were otherwise simply trying to survive.

The historian and philosopher of urbanism Jane Jacobs remarked in an interview with Stewart Brand that with the Fall of Rome city dwellers re-inhabited the rural areas of the region.

From another point of departure, Yi-Fu Tuan takes a view that such trends have often been privileged and motivated by sentiment, who wrote in his book Topophilia (1974): "Awareness of the past is an important element in the love of place." Tuan writes that an appreciation of nature springs from wealth, privilege, and the antithetical values of cities. He argues that literature about land (and, subsequently, about going back to the land) is largely sentimental: "Little is known about the farmer's attitudes to nature..." Tuan finds historical instances of the desire of the civilized to escape civilization in the Hellenistic, Roman, Augustan, and Romantic eras, as well as, from one of the earliest recorded myths, the Epic of Gilgamesh.

=== North America ===
Regarding North America, many individuals and households have moved from urban or suburban circumstances to rural ones at different times; for instance, the economic theorist and land-based American experimenter Ralph Borsodi (author of Flight from the City) is said to have influenced thousands of urban-living people to try a modern homesteading life during the Great Depression.

In 1933, the New Deal town of Arthurdale, West Virginia, was built using the back-to-the-land ideas current at the time.

After World War II, interest in moving to rural land once again began to rise. In 1947, Betty MacDonald published what became a popular book, The Egg and I, telling her story of marrying and then moving to a small farm on the Olympic Peninsula in Washington state. This story was the basis of a successful comedy film starring Claudette Colbert and Fred MacMurray.

The Canadian writer Farley Mowat says that many returned veterans after World War II sought a meaningful life far from the ignobility of modern warfare, regarding his own experience as typical of the pattern. In Canada, those who sought a life completely outside the cities, suburbs, and towns frequently moved into semi-wilderness environs.

During the 1960s and 1970s, the phenomenon of the rural relocation trend became sizable enough to be identified in the American demographic statistics.

The roots of this movement can perhaps be traced to some of Bradford Angier's books, such as At Home in the Woods (1951) and We Like it Wild (1963), Louise Dickinson Rich's We Took to the Woods (1942) and subsequent books, or perhaps even more compellingly to the publication of Helen and Scott Nearing's book, Living the Good Life (1954). This book chronicles the Nearings' move to an older house in a rural area of Vermont and their self-sufficient and simple lifestyle. In their initial move, the Nearings were driven by the circumstances of the Great Depression and influenced by earlier writers, particularly Henry David Thoreau. Their book was published six years after A Sand County Almanac, by the ecologist and environmental activist Aldo Leopold, was published in 1948. Influences aside, the Nearings both planned ahead and worked hard, developing their homestead and life according to a twelve-point plan they had drafted. And when they found themselves no longer comfortable as the local area changed, they moved on, to start again elsewhere in Maine.

The narrative of Phil Cousineau's documentary film Ecological Design: Inventing the Future asserts that in the decades after World War II, "The world was forced to confront the dark shadow of science and industry... There was a clarion call for a return to a life of human scale." By the late 1960s, many people had recognized that, leaving their city or suburban lives, they completely lacked any familiarity with such basics of life as food sources (for instance, what a potato plant looks like, or the act of milking a cow)—and they felt out of touch with nature, in general. While the back-to-the-land movement was not strictly part of the counterculture of the 1960s, the two movements had some overlap in participation.

Many people were attracted to getting more in touch with nature and the basics that back to the land advocates described. The movement was driven by the negatives of modern urban life: rampant consumerism, the failings of government and society, including the Vietnam War, and a perceived general urban deterioration, including growing public concern about air and water pollution. Events such as the Watergate scandal and the 1973 energy crisis contributed to these views. Some people rejected the struggle and boredom of "moving up the company ladder." Paralleling the desire for reconnection with nature was a desire to reconnect with physical work. Farmer and author Gene Logsdon expressed the aim aptly as: "the kind of independence that defines success in terms of how much food, clothing, shelter, and contentment I could produce for myself rather than how much I could buy."

A prominent segment within the movement was composed of those who were familiar with rural life and farming, had skills, and wanted land of their own on which they could demonstrate that organic farming could be made practical and economically successful.

Besides the Nearings and other authors writing later along similar lines, another influence from the world of American publishing was the Whole Earth Catalogs. Stewart Brand and a circle of friends and family began the effort in 1968 because Brand believed that there was a groundswell of biologists, designers, engineers, sociologists, organic farmers, and social experimenters who wished to transform civilization along lines that might be called "sustainable". Brand and cohorts created a catalog of "tools"—defined broadly to include useful books, design aids, maps, gardening implements, carpentry and masonry tools, metalworking equipment, and more.

Another important publication was The Mother Earth News, a periodical (originally on newsprint) that was founded a couple years after the Catalog. Ultimately gaining a large circulation, the magazine was focused on how-to articles, personal stories of successful and budding homesteaders, interviews with key thinkers, and the like. The magazine stated its philosophy was based on returning to people a greater measure of control of their own lives.

Many of the North American back-to-the-landers of the 1960s and 1970s read and learned from the Mother Earth News, the Whole Earth Catalog series, and derivative publications. As time went on, the movement drew new people into it, more or less independently of any impetus from the publishing world.

== See also ==
- Agrarianism
- Alicia Bay Laurel
- Anarcho-primitivism
- Back to nature
- Bioregionalism
- Communitarianism
- Community Food Security Coalition
- Deindustrialization
- Down to the Countryside Movement
- Drop City
- Ecovillage
- Foxfire books
- Georgism
- Green anarchism
- Harrowsmith magazine
- Hovel in the Hills
- Intentional community
- Karl Hess
- Lasse Nordlund
- Lebensreform
- Localism
- Neo-Tribalism
- Noble savage
- Permaculture
- Physiocracy
- Plain people
- Primitive technology
- Renewable energy
- Jean-Jacques Rousseau
- Small is Beautiful
- Seachange
- Solarpunk
- Subsistence agriculture
- Survivalism
- Sustainability
- Sustainable living
- The Farm (Tennessee)
- Tolstoyan movement
- Twin Oaks Community
- Wandervogel movement
- We Are As Gods (book)
- Wendell Berry
- World Brotherhood Colonies

== Bibliography ==
- Agnew, Eleanor. Back from the Land: How Young Americans Went to Nature in the 1970s, and Why They Came Back. 2005.
- Brand, Stewart et al., editors 1968-1998 Whole Earth Catalogs
- Coffey, Richard A. Bogtrotter. ISBN 0-9641908-1-8 (reprint edition with afterword by author).
- Curl, John 2007. Memories of Drop City: The First Hippie Commune of the 1960s and the Summer of Love. iUniverse. ISBN 0-595-42343-4.
- Faires, Nicole 2006. Deliberate Life: The Ultimate Homesteading Guide. ISBN 0-9782042-0-4
- Fairfield, Richard. The Modern Utopian: Alternative Communities of the '60's and '70's. Process Media, 2010.
- Grant, Brian L. "Surveying the Back to the Land Movement in the Seventies". Published online at Back To The Land
- Jacob, Jeffrey Carl. New Pioneers: The Back-to-the-Land Movement and the Search for a Sustainable Future. Penn State University Press. 1997. ISBN 978-0-271-02989-4.
- Nearing, Helen and Nearing, Scott 1954. Living the Good Life. ISBN 0-8052-0970-0 (Reprint edition).
- Nearing, Helen and Nearing, Scott 1979. Continuing the Good Life.
- Philips, Jared M. Hipbillies: Deep Revolution in the Arkansas Ozarks. The University of Arkansas Press, 2019. ISBN 9781610756594
- The Mother Earth News, a magazine devoted to the lifestyle
- Daloz, Kate, 2016 "We Are As Gods: Back to the Land in the 1970s on the Quest for a New America" ISBN 1610392256
