= J. J. van der Leeuw =

Dutch theosophist and author (1893–1934)

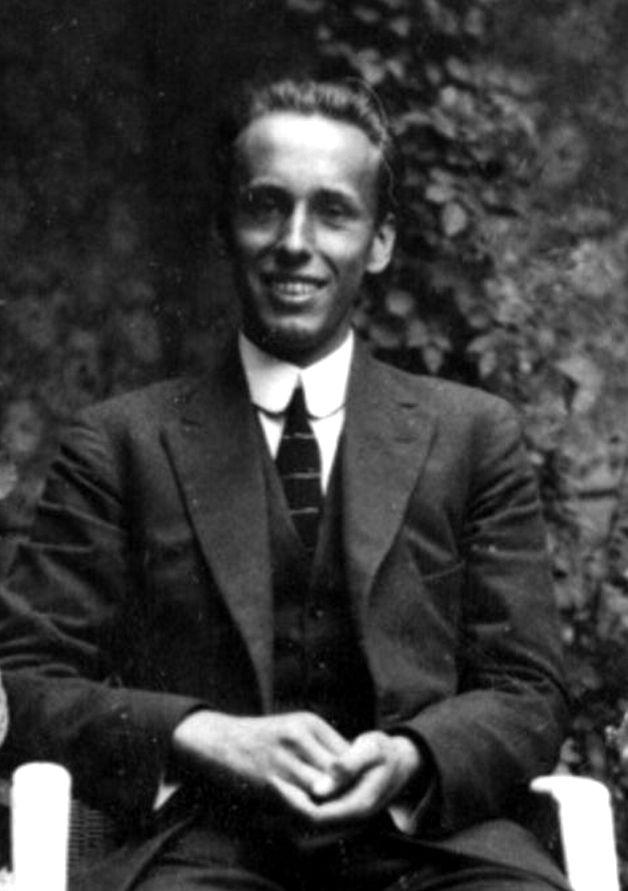
Koos van der Leeuw, 1920-25

Jacobus Johannes (J.J.) van der Leeuw (Rotterdam, August 26, 1893 – Tanganyika, August 23, 1934) was a Dutch theosophist and author.

== Biography ==
J.J. van der Leeuw (nickname 'Koos'), member of the family Van der Leeuw, was born August 26, 1893, in Rotterdam, Netherlands, son of Marius Adrianus Gabriël van der Leeuw Sr. (1856-1923) and Madelaine van Dam (1868-1929). Marius van der Leeuw was partner of the firm Erven de Wed. J. van Nelle, wholesalers in coffee, tea and tobacco. Koos and his brothers Cees (Cornelis Hendrik van der Leeuw, 1890-1973) and Dick (Marius Adrianus Gabriël van der Leeuw, 1894-1936) were known in Rotterdam as “The Dandys” due to their modern and luxurious lifestyle. Van der Leeuw died in a plane crash in Tanganyika, Africa, on August 23, 1934. He was single without children.

== Education ==
After graduating in 1910, van der Leeuw left for Cologne to study at the School of Economics. He abandoned this study to opt for Law School at Leiden University. During his study years he founded the Dutch section of the English Practical Idealists Association (PIA), a youth movement aimed at initiating a paradigm shift of the spiritual mind amongst students. Other members in this organization included Adriaan Viruly and Kees Boeke. Because of his scientific aspirations it soon became clear that Van der Leeuw would not become his father’s successor as CEO at Van Nelle. In 1920 he received his PhD at Leiden University with a thesis titled Historical Idealist Politics.

== Theosophy ==
J.J. van der Leeuw was a close friend of Jiddu Krishnamurti. Just like his brother Cees, he was closely involved with hosting the annual Order of the Star camps at the Eerde estate in Ommen. This property was owned by Philip baron van Pallandt and it was here that Krishnamurti had settled his Order of the Star in the East.

In 1924 J.J. van der Leeuw went to Australia for occult training with C.W. Leadbeater, who was at that time guiding young people spiritually in Sydney. J.J. van der Leeuw became a priest in the Liberal Catholic Church and treasurer of the Manor, the villa owned by the Theosophical Society in Sydney. There he also founded the King Arthur’s School for boys. Back in the Netherlands van der Leeuw was elected as president of the Dutch Section of the Theosophical Society from 1930 until 1931.

He was well known for his lecture Revelation or Realization, The Conflict in Theosophy which he held at the Federation of Theosophical Lodges in London on June 15, 1930, at the Dutch convention on June 21, 1930, and before the Congress of the European Federation on June 30, 1930. In this lecture he publicly defended Krishnamurti who had disbanded the Order of the Star in 1929.

== Political activities ==
In the early Thirties Van der Leeuw traveled the world to elaborate on his social-scientific and philosophical ideas. They were, to a large extent, dedicated to his wish to kick-start a new world order. He had become member of the London-based New Commonwealth, which was meant to be the protagonist of a new world authority to maintain international order and strive for world peace. Besides all this he was also dedicated to education.

== Interactions with Sigmund Freud ==
Van der Leeuw lived in London, but during 1933 was a regular visitor of Sigmund Freud in Vienna, where he was being analyzed. At one point in his analysis, the poet H.D. had the hour after him, and wrote about her brief interactions with him in her essay of reminiscences of Freud. Freud called Van der Leeuw an “eminent scholar” whom he called the "Flying Dutchman" because of his love of aviation (Friedman 2002, p. 400).

== Death ==
Van der Leeuw received his pilot’s license in 1933. In 1934 he was invited by The New Education Fellowship in South Africa to hold a lecture during their Johannesburg conference. Especially for this purpose Van der Leeuw bought a De Havilland Leopard Moth (GA-CCLX). During his return flight from this conference Van der Leeuw crashed into a mountain in the Republic of Tanganyika. His demise received a lot of attention by both the national and international press.

== Bibliography ==
1. Historical-Idealistic politics (1920)
2. Practical Idealism and the P.I.A (1920)
3. The Fire of Creation (1926), for which he received the Subba Row Medal
4. Gods in Exile (1926)
5. Dramatic History of Christian Faith. From the beginning to the death of St. Augustine (1927)
6. The Conquest of illusion (1928)
7. Revelation or Realization, the conflict in theosophy (Lecture, 1930)
8. The Task of Education in a World Crisis (1933)
9. Why a world police force is inevitable (1934)
10. We can banish the war! A powerful stand surpassing the thought of war (posthumously published in 1950, co-author is Adriaan Viruly)

== Other sources ==
1. Matthijs Dicke, Hoe komt wie vliegt ooit tot bedaren. M.A.G. van der Leeuw, ondernemer in het interbellum. Uitgeverij de Hef publishers, Rotterdam 2007
2. Fay van Ierlant, Wie was J.J. van der Leeuw, in: Theosofia 109/3 (2008)
3. Susan Standford Friedman (editor). Analyzing Freud: Letters of H.D., Bryher, and Their Circle. Paterson Marsh Agency, London. 2002 ISBN 0-8112-1499-0
