= Homesteading =

Lifestyle of self-sufficiency

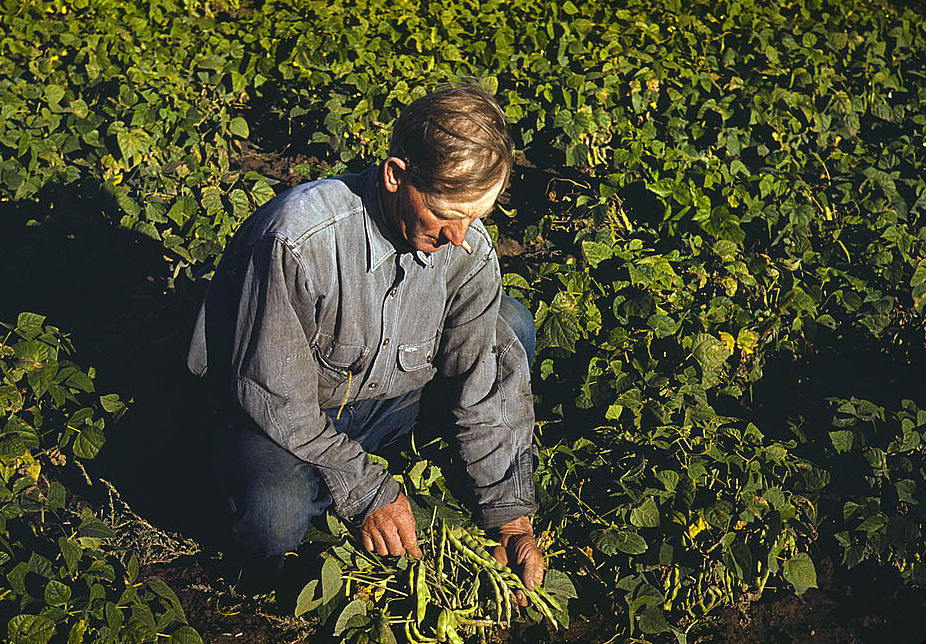
A homesteader turning up beans in Pie Town, New Mexico, 1940

Homesteading is a lifestyle of self-sufficiency. It is characterized by subsistence agriculture, home preservation of food, and may also involve the small scale production of textiles, clothing, and craft work for household use or sale. Homesteading has been pursued in various ways around the world and throughout different historical eras. It is typically distinguished from rural village or commune living by the isolation of the homestead (socially, physically, or both). Use of the term in the United States dates back to the Homestead Act (1862) and before. In sub-Saharan Africa, particularly in nations formerly controlled by the British Empire, a homestead is the household compound for a single extended family. In the UK the terms smallholder and croft are rough synonyms of homesteader.

Modern homesteaders often use renewable energy options including solar and wind power. Many also choose to plant and grow heirloom vegetables and to raise heritage livestock. Homesteading is not defined by where someone lives, such as the city or the country, but by the lifestyle choices they make.

== As historical governmental policy ==
Historically, homesteading has been used by governmental entities (engaged in national expansion) to help settle what were termed unsettled areas, especially in the United States, Canada, and Australia. This resulted in the violent relocation of many Indigenous people. Guided by legal homestead principles, many of these "homestead acts" were instituted in the 19th and 20th centuries and targeted specific areas, with most being discontinued after a set time-frame or goal.

Renewed interest in homesteading was brought about by U.S. President Franklin D. Roosevelt's program of Subsistence Homesteading in the 1930s and 1940s.

== As a social movement ==
The attractiveness of back-to-the-land movements dates from the Roman era, and has been noted in Asian poetry and philosophy tracts as well (Agriculturalism). In the 1700s, the philosophy of physiocracy developed in France and by the 1800s and early 1900s the philosophy of Agrarianism had taken hold in many places around the world. The ideas of modern homesteading proponents, such as Ralph Borsodi, gained in popularity in the 1960s in the United States. Self-sufficiency movements in the 1990s and 2000s began to apply the concept to urban and suburban settings, known as urban homesteading. According to author John Seymour, "urban homesteading" incorporates small-scale sustainable agriculture and homemaking.

== As an economic choice ==
In homesteading, social and government support systems are frequently eschewed in favor of self-reliance and relative deprivation in order to maximize independence and self-determination. The degree of independence occurs along a spectrum, with many homesteaders creating foodstuffs or crafts to appeal to high-end niche markets in order to meet financial needs. Other homesteaders come to the lifestyle following successful careers which provide the funding for land, housing, taxes, and specialized equipment such as solar panels, farm equipment, and electric generators.

Modern government regulation—in the form of property taxes, building codes, food safety codes, zoning regulations, minimum wage and social security for occasional labor, and town council restrictions on landscaping and animal keeping—can increase the marginal cost of home production of food in areas affected by these restrictions. Careful choice of homesteading location is essential for economic success.

Potential benefits of homesteading include a satisfying standard of living and a healthier, more rewarding lifestyle than more conventional patterns of living.

== See also ==
- Permaculture
- Seasteading
- Urban homesteading
