= Tinder Hearth =

Restaurant in Brooksville, Maine, U.S.

- Interactive map of Tinder Hearth

Restaurant information
- Location: 1452 Coastal Road, Brooksville, Maine, 04617, United States
- Coordinates: 44°23′9″N 68°45′11″W

Tinder Hearth is a restaurant in Brooksville, Maine. Established in May 2007, the business was included in The New York Times's 2023 list of the 50 best restaurants in the United States.
