= Pond Island (Penobscot Bay) =

Island in Hancock County, Maine, United States

- Location within Maine

Geography
- Location: Penobscot Bay
- Coordinates: 44°17′36″N 68°48′29″W
- Area: 32 acres (13 ha)

Administration
- United States of America
- State: Maine
- County: Hancock County
- Town: Deer Isle

Pond Island is a small 32-acre (13 ha) island in Penobscot Bay, on the central coast of Maine, United States. The island is a conservation property of the Maine Coast Heritage Trust, and is open to the public, with two small campsites. The island was listed on the National Register of Historic Places in 1979 for the significance of its prehistoric archaeological sites. It is named for the saltwater pond located at its center.

== Description ==
Pond Island is located in Penobscot Bay, south of Cape Rosier, the western portion of Brooksville, and roughly west of Little Deer Isle, one of the major islands of the town of Deer Isle. The island is geologically a combination of barrier sand dunes that were joined at a small knoll, with a small pond at its center that is connected to the bay via a tidal channel. The island is oriented roughly east–west, with slight tilt placing the western end further north than the eastern. Off the western end is a smaller islet called John's Head, which is joined to the island at low tide. The eastern end of the island is subject to erosion.

The island consists of a combination of sand dunes and salt marshes, woods and meadows, in addition to the salt pond. This mix of habitats supports a wide array of wildlife, mainly shorebirds and wading birds. John's Head is a significant nesting area for gulls, eiders, and guillemots. There are two small campsites available for public use (advance permission required for their use by larger groups), and a trail leads to the island's high point.

The area around the salt pond is known to be rich in archaeological artifacts; investigation has yielded evidence of human habitation dating from historic times as far back as 2000 years. The island was purchased c. 1979 by Philadelphia Conservationists, Inc., a Pennsylvania-based conservation group. It granted Acadia National Park a "forever wild" conservation easement to the island in 1982, and turned it over to the Maine Coast Heritage Trust in 1995. The island was listed on the National Register of Historic Places in 1979 for its archaeological significance.

== See also ==
- List of islands of Maine
- National Register of Historic Places listings in Hancock County, Maine
