= Warren K. Moorehead =

American archaeologist (1866–1939)

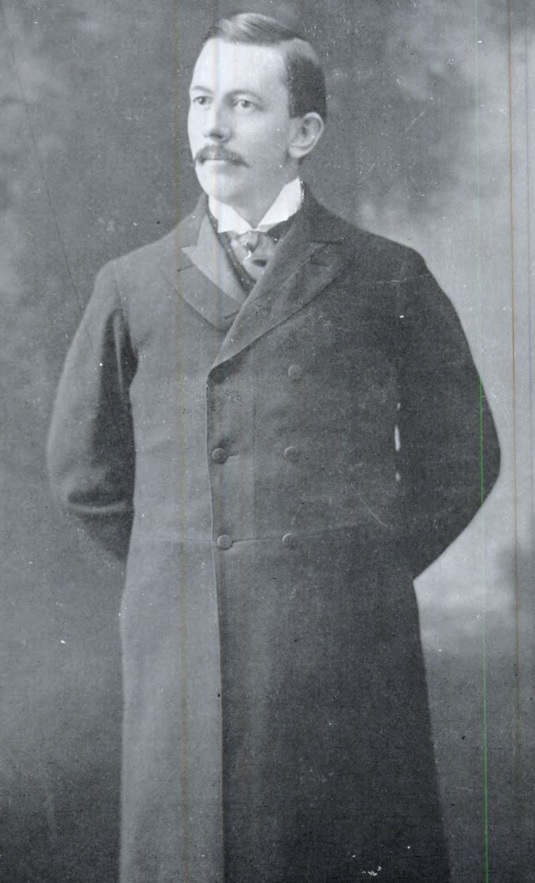
- 1898
- Born: March 10, 1866; Siena, Italy
- Died: January 5, 1939 (aged 72); Xenia, Ohio

Signature
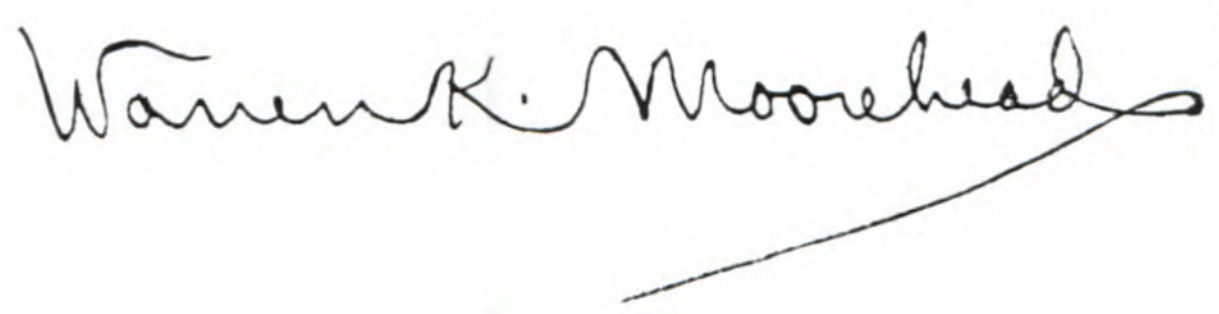

Warren King Moorehead (March 10, 1866 – January 5, 1939) was an American archaeologist and writer who worked on excavating and surveying various Native American sites, including Fort Ancient. Moorehead the first curator of the Ohio Archaeological Society and was deemed the "Dean of American archaeology". He died on January 5, 1939, at the age of 72, and is buried in his hometown of Xenia, Ohio.

Moorehead is credited with excavating more ancient earthworks than all archaeologists before and after him. Due to Moorehead's primary focus on artifact recovery in his early career, his often careless documentation of excavated sites, and the fact that he lost many of his own important field notes (including those from 1891 at the Hopewell Site), Moorehead is often remembered as a destructive force among modern archaeologists. That said, Moorehead was influential in the preservation of some historical sites such as Fort Ancient.

== Early life ==
Warren King Moorehead was born on March 10, 1866, in Siena, Italy. His parents, Helen King and Dr. William G. Moorehead, were missionaries. His mother died when he was quite young, and while his father remarried and became head of a Presbyterian seminary in Xenia, Ohio, his travels for keeping that institution open left young Warren and his sister in the care of two aunts, who are recalled vividly in Helen Hooven Santmyer's non-fictional Ohio Town and the novel And Ladies of the Club. In Ohio, Moorehead began investigating earthworks near his home in Xenia.

Moorehead's grandfather was Joseph Warren King, whose wealth from the King's Powder Mills fortune rooted in the American Civil War became both an opportunity and a curse for the fledgling archaeologist. Digging about in the earth and soil was considered beneath a refined family, and for much of his life Warren King Moorehead was pressured to enter the family business. Parts of the 19th century infrastructure remain in the Little Miami River Valley near Kings Mills, Ohio, a near- ghost town next to the Peters Cartridge Company once the King's Powder Mills, desolate except for the now more famous neighbor named after it, "Kings Island," the Cincinnati area amusement park.

== Education ==
Moorehead attended Denison University and graduated in 1887. During this time, he began to study and write about Fort Ancient.

Excavations and collections begun as a schoolboy continued through self-financed work taking him to a display of his own at the 1888 Cincinnati Centennial Exposition, and contact with Dr. Thomas Wilson of the Smithsonian Institution. Wilson encouraged and possibly helped Moorehead to enter the University of Pennsylvania for study under the famous Edward Drinker Cope, but opportunities to lecture and write for publication led Warren away from class work. His publication of the novel "Wanneta, The Sioux," in 1890 led to a lecture tour and opportunities to write for a larger audience than just his professors.

== Early work ==
=== The Ghost Dance and Wounded Knee ===
A contract to write for a national magazine about the "Ghost Dance" phenomenon on the Pine Ridge Indian Reservation put Moorehead on the scene for the critical weeks leading up to what is now known as the Wounded Knee Massacre of Dec. 29, 1890. Moorehead was not present, though his camera was used by journalists who were still on the scene to record the horrific aftermath; Gen. John Rutter Brooke ordered Moorehead off the reservation under armed military escort on Dec. 28, according to Moorehead's journal because he was the only reporter present who spoke some of the language and was permitted to stay overnight with the Sioux in their encampments.

=== 1893 World's Columbian Exposition in Chicago ===
After a frustrating period trying to influence legislators to give justice to the Sioux and publish his account of events leading up to the massacre, Moorehead returned to Ohio and found a position developing the state display for the 1893 World's Columbian Exposition (Chicago World's Fair), which led him to work with Frederic Ward Putnam, the Harvard professor who began the academic field of archaeology in the United States.

Some of the field work Moorehead did for Putnam resulted in the Hopewell culture "type site", now Hopewell Culture National Historical Park, near Chillicothe, Ohio, setting the parameters for the study of Native American Mound Builders of the Ohio River valley around 2000 years ago. This work also went into the World's Fair display, became a published volume for Moorehead, and caught the attention of the organizers of the Ohio Historical & Archaeological Society (now the Ohio History Connection) which was just begun in 1885. Regrettably, Moorehead's destruction and lack of documentation regarding the Hopewell Type Site (and many of his other sites) has left many archaeological questions unable to be answered For example, when Moorehead encountered Mound 25 of the Hopewell Mound Group, he observed that the mound had rocks and boulders making two large panther effigies. Regardless of such observation, he did not document these findings in a systematic way and proceeded to nearly level the mound.

Efforts to have Fort Ancient purchased and cared for by the state were spurred by Moorehead's publications on that site and other Ohio cultural marvels. The Ohio General Assembly voted to purchase Fort Ancient based on Moorehead's work.

=== Curator of Archaeology ===
When the 1893 WCE ended, and a hoped for faculty position with the new college on the site (soon to be the University of Chicago) did not work out quickly, Moorehead accepted the position as what would be the first curator of archaeology for the OAHS. With the support of President Orton of Ohio State University, a museum was established in what is now Orton Hall on the OSU Oval, and Moorehead was made a professor of archaeology at OSU, the only part of his work that was paid. OAHS, with little money from the state and sites already to manage (Fort Ancient, and Serpent Mound which had been purchased by Dr. Putnam with money raised at society teas in Newport, RI, but now a local obligation to manage), encouraged Moorehead to pay for his travel and speaking and research by selling duplicate artifacts. This process would today not only be discouraged but is now both unethical and illegal; the 1890s found it unremarkable.

With the aunts refusing to release any money for "that dirty work," Moorehead launched into an ambitious plan to create an atlas of Ohio mounds and earthworks, which he saw eroding and destroyed wherever he went across the Midwest, and even in forays into the American southwest, becoming one of the first surveyors of Chaco Canyon and Mesa Verde.

== Personal life ==
Moorehead married Evelyn Ludwig in Circleville, Ohio in November 1892. The two had two children, Ludwig King Moorehead and Singleton Peabody Moorehead.

Tuberculosis was nearly always fatal in Moorehead's day, and when he was clearly diagnosed with the disease, a second trip to the desert southwest became part of what turned into a permanent leave from OAHS after 1898. (His assistant, William Corless Mills, completed what is now known as the Mills Atlas of 1904, but Moorehead laid out much of the material that is in the volume.) Finding no relief in the southwest, he returned to meet with Robert Singleton Peabody at his home near Philadelphia, a wealthy descendant of George Peabody, trader and philanthropist, who collected pottery and baskets from Indigenous cultures throughout the New World.

Peabody, seeing how ill Moorehead had become, generously offered a season of treatment at Saranac Lake, New York, the famous tuberculosis sanitarium where just a few years earlier Robert Louis Stevenson had sought relief. The season turned into almost three years, and due to blood loss and anemia Moorehead's wife Evelyn Ludwig (of Circleville, Ohio) and their son Ludwig King Moorehead were told repeatedly to prepare for Warren's death, through 1899 to 1901.

== Later work ==
Moorehead was based at the Phillips Academy, Andover, MA, from 1901 to 1938. He and Evelyn had a second son, Singleton Peabody Moorehead, who would become a key architect with the Colonial Williamsburg Foundation and is buried on the grounds of Bruton Parish Church there. With Peabody's influence and money, a museum and program was established at Phillips Andover Academy, with the dedication program including a fellowship from the Peabody-established Victoria Institute and the award of an honorary doctorate from Dartmouth College (also a recipient of significant Peabody largesse). He was also Curator of the University Museum of Ohio State University (1894–1897), worked at archaeological sites along the Ohio River, and at Chaco Canyon and up into Mesa Verde. As head of the Robert S. Peabody Museum of Archaeology in Andover, Massachusetts from 1902 to 1920, Moorehead launched into a program of research and publication that went on to include the Red Paint People of the Atlantic coast, Cahokia Mounds in Illinois from 1921, and Etowah Indian Mounds in Georgia from 1925. His approach was not without detractors. In 1923, the fledgling Central Section of the American Anthropological Association sent him a rebuke concerning a flyer he had distributed which had laid out a manner in which collectors of artifacts could cooperate with him or other archaeologists.

=== Cahokia and Illinois ===
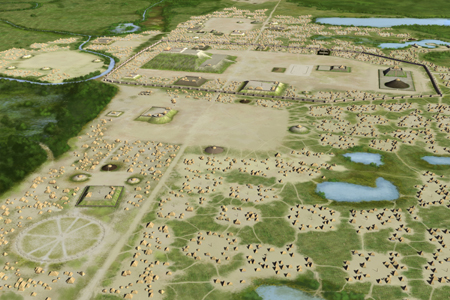
Cahokia, Mississippian culture site in Illinois

Moorehead worked at the Cahokia site between 1921 and 1927. Cahokia is now a UNESCO World Heritage Site. He was instrumental in getting the State of Illinois to buy a portion of the Cahokia site in order to create a state park. From 1927 to 1939 he worked on sites in the Illinois River Valley. Major collections from Cahokia are at the Illinois State Museum and the University of Illinois ().

=== Von Mach ===
In the 1920s Moorehead excavated the Von Mach Site on the property of Edmund von Mach in Brooksville, Maine. The site was added to the National Register of Historic Places on January 17, 1989.

=== Etowah ===
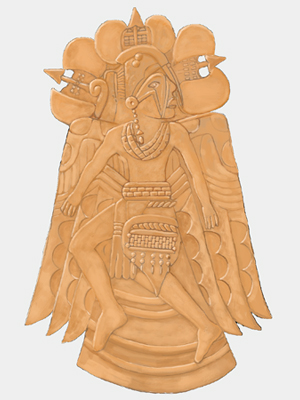
Etowah Dancing Warrior copper plate

Moorehead began excavation at the Etowah mounds site in Georgia during the winter of 1925. His work lasted four winter seasons, conducting excavations on Mound C and the surrounding village area. Moorehead's work on Mound C led to the discovery of a rich array of Mississippian culture goods. While working on Mound C, Moorehead also worked a small amount on Mounds A and B, but his excavation was object-oriented and ceased soon after no exotic goods were encountered. The Etowah Papers, Moorehead's report, were published in 1932. Moorehead found several Mississippian copper plates decorated by human dancers wearing eagle paraphernalia. The site is culturally affiliated with and protected by the Muscogee (Creek) Nation, currently owned by the state of Georgia, and has been considered a protected National Historic Landmark since 1965.

=== The Spirit of Wounded Knee ===
He was named by President Theodore Roosevelt a member of the board of commissioners for the Bureau of Indian Affairs with the Department of Interior in 1909, and his work on behalf of Indian Land Claims, exposing fraudulent Indian agents, and seeking better health care on reservations probably made many Washington bureaucrats feel the same way Gen. Brooke did in 1890. After many attempts to remove him and silence the commission, especially after his leadership of the White Earth Indian Reservation hearings on injustices following the Dawes Act and Moorehead's book "The American Indian in the United States, Period 1850-1914" (), the Great Depression was used as pretext to dissolve the commission in 1933, after almost 25 years of service by Moorehead.

== Death and legacy ==
With many honors and published volumes to his credit, and a thriving and vital field of research and informed speculation well established, Moorehead died in 1939 and was buried near his parents, grandfather, and aunts in Xenia. The family home is now the heart of the Greene County Historical Society; where portraits of his father William and grandfather Joseph are on prominent display. Little is known there, however, about Warren; their papers include a reminiscence from a contemporary on Moorehead's death calling him, from their childhood together, "a born archaeologist." By the time of his death, he had come to be known as the dean of American archaeology. His obituary in the American Anthropologist noted his abhorrence to what he perceived as a growing "aloofness" of some of his "scientific colleagues" in the field of archaeology.

Today, Moorehead is often considered a "pillager" within the field of archaeology. In his early career, Moorehead typically used horses and scrapers to quickly remove dirt layers from ancient mounds, often obliterating important historical sites, working quickly recover artifacts during a brief summer season ranging across the state. While he improved his methodology throughout his career, his youthful work in Ohio left a mark on his reputation that has stuck; the Ohio Archaeological and Historical Society quarterly reports he filed in the 1890s included indelible photographs of mounds being razed with the heavy equipment of that day. What is often overlooked is that in the narrative, Moorehead would encounter mounds already being taken down by county road crews and construction laborers, and would negotiate to allow an interval of investigation in the middle of the demolition before the project was completed. In his work after 1900, he and his field workers used the archaeological techniques then becoming standard in excavations.

Also damaging to Moorehead's modern reputation was his support of the amateur and collector communities throughout his career. He believed that collection of artifacts was not necessarily a bad thing, and promoted good relations between professional archaeologists and collectors to the end of his life. But even in his younger days, Moorehead recorded in his diary personal regrets over past practices, and his hopes to be able to do better work in the future.

== Publications ==
- Moorehead, Warren K (1891). World's Columbian Exposition Expedition to Southern Ohio. Field Museum of Natural History.
- Moorehead, Warren K (1895). The Examination of Fort Ancient, Ohio. Field Museum of Natural History.
- Moorehead, Warren K (1900). Prehistoric Implements - A Reference Book. The Robert Clarke Company.
- Moorehead, Warren K (1910) The stone age in North America Vol. 1 of 2, Boston: Houghton Mifflin Company
- Moorehead, Warren K (1931). Archaeology of the Arkansas River Valley. Yale University Press.
