= Cape Rosier, Maine =

Cape on the coast of Maine, U.S.

Cape Rosier
- Peninsula
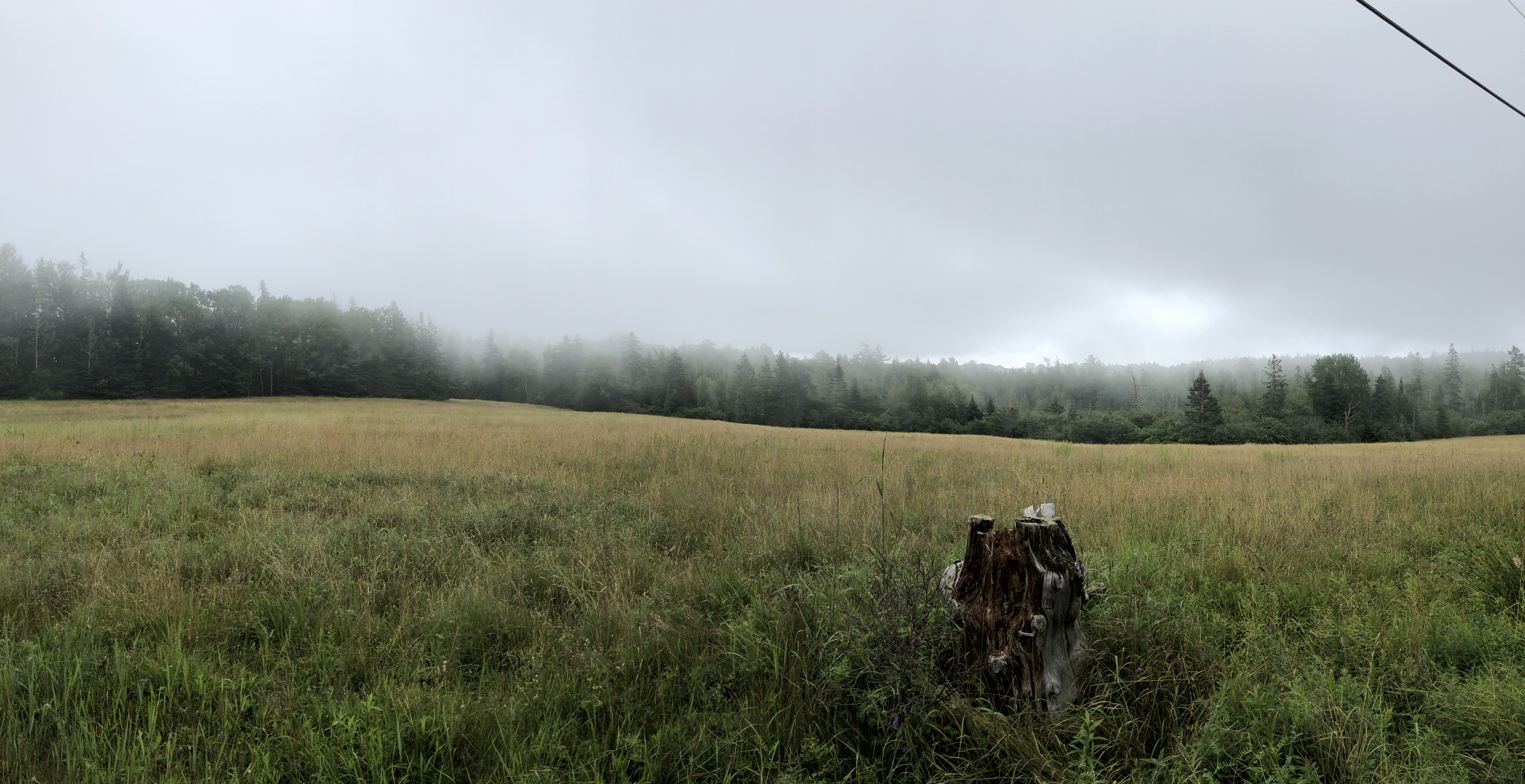
- Hay field near Harborside, Maine, in the fog

- Location within Maine
- Coordinates: 44°18′43.2″N 68°49′36.6″W
- Location: Maine, United States
- Etymology: Named for James Rosier

Cape Rosier is a cape on the south central coast of the U.S. state of Maine, extending into the Atlantic Ocean. The peninsula reaches south and westward from the mainland into Penobscot Bay. It constitutes the western part of the town of Brooksville, in Hancock County, cut off from the rest of the town at a narrow neck where Orcutt Harbor extends from Eggemoggin Reach northward, and nearly reaches Smith Cove on the north side of the cape. To the west, it forms a part of the estuary of the Penobscot River. The head of the cape is at 44°18'43.2"N 68°49'36.6"W.

One of Brooksville's four unincorporated villages, Harborside, is located on the northwest coast of the cape. To the north of the peninsula, across the water, is Castine, to its west is Islesboro and beyond it the Camden Hills. On land, it lies about 25 miles (40 km) southwest of the county seat at Ellsworth. To the south of the cape are several small islands, including Spectacle, Pond, Hog and Western, and to the southeast is Deer Isle.

== Geology and ecology ==
The Maine coastal landscape was created by glacier ice and is geologically young, having been covered in ice sheets a mile thick during the last ice age. The land has not yet fully adjusted to the melting of those ice sheets about 11,000 years ago, which caused drainage networks to form coastal rivers and basins, with the rivers meeting raw bedrock or glacially deposited gravel ridges (eskers and moraines). Ore deposits of zinc and copper, among other minerals, occur on Cape Rosier. The rockbed of the Cape and adjacent mainland is composed of "a series of volcanics, rhyolitic and andesitic flows, agglomerates, and pyroclastics" intruded by diorite.

Goose Falls is one of just a few "reversing" falls on the East Coast—all of them in Maine—where rivers flow forward and backward twice a day, with the changing tides. These tidal falls form where freshwater rivers or bays meet the sea at a narrow passageway, and are a relatively rare phenomenon that requires the bedrock geology, channel width and depth to be "just right to produce a significant height difference on a rising or falling tide." At low tide Goose Pond drains into Penobscot Bay through a cleft in a bedrock outcrop, while at high tide the falls flood back through the crevice into the pond.

The glaciers formed land that is a highly productive wild blueberry (Vaccinium angustifolium) habitat. Humans have long cultivated blueberries in the region, and its fruit and foliage are eaten by Cape Rosier's black bears, raccoons, foxes, white-tailed deer and birds. The low-bush blueberry's leaves also serve as hosts for caterpillar larvae for several moth species.

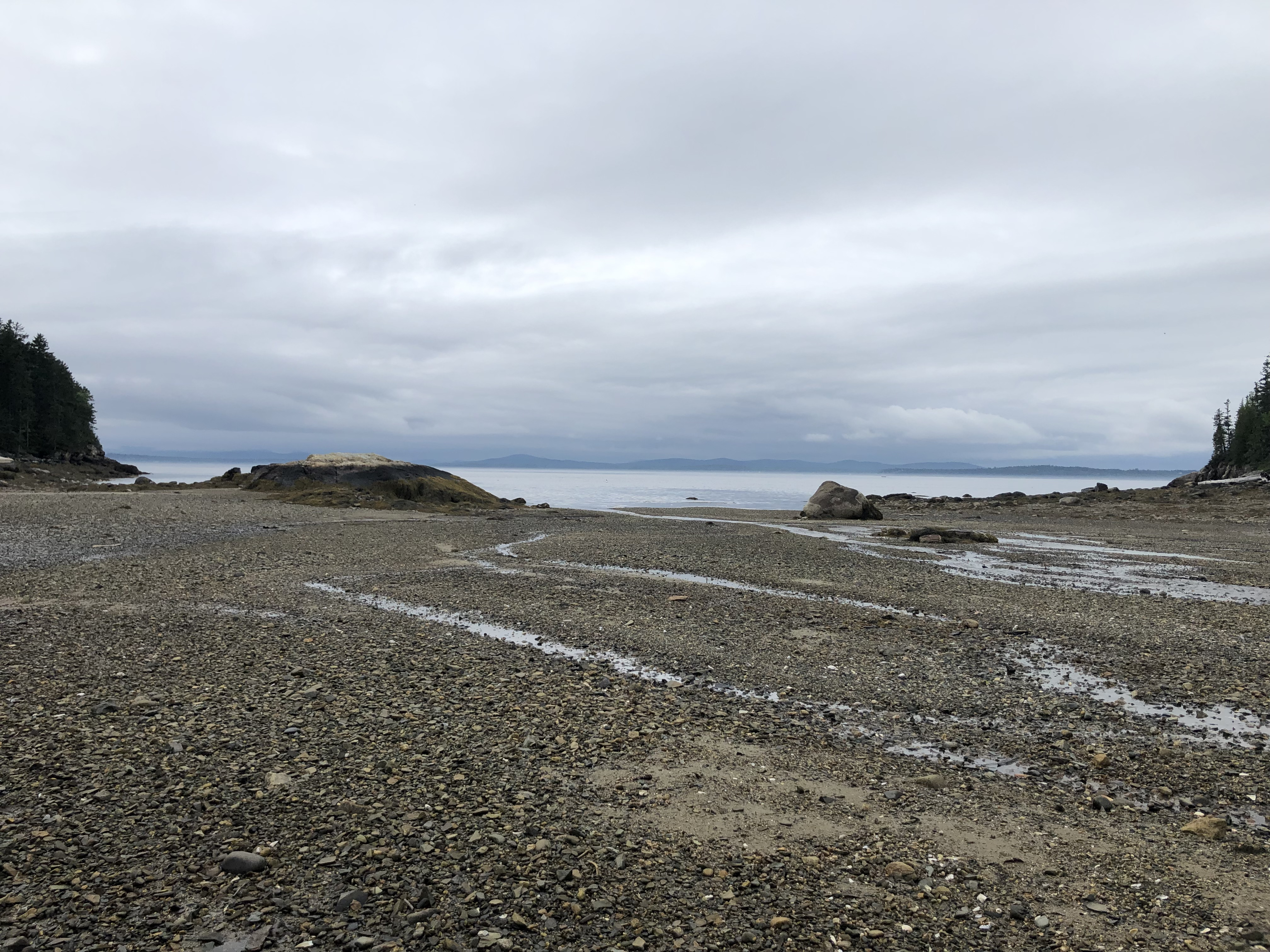
Stony beach at low tide, Cape Rosier, Maine.

The forests of Cape Rosier and the nearby islands are dominated by spruces and firs. The northeastern part of the Maine is classified in the Downeast Coast ecoregion (a subset of Acadian Plains and Hills) by the Environmental Protection Agency. Most of the shoreline consists of bluffs, along with salt marshes and tidal flats. Roughly 99% of Cape Rosier's coastal bluffs are stable according to observations for the Maine Geological Survey . The beaches are in coves, mainly rocky at high tide, with some becoming mud flats at low tide.

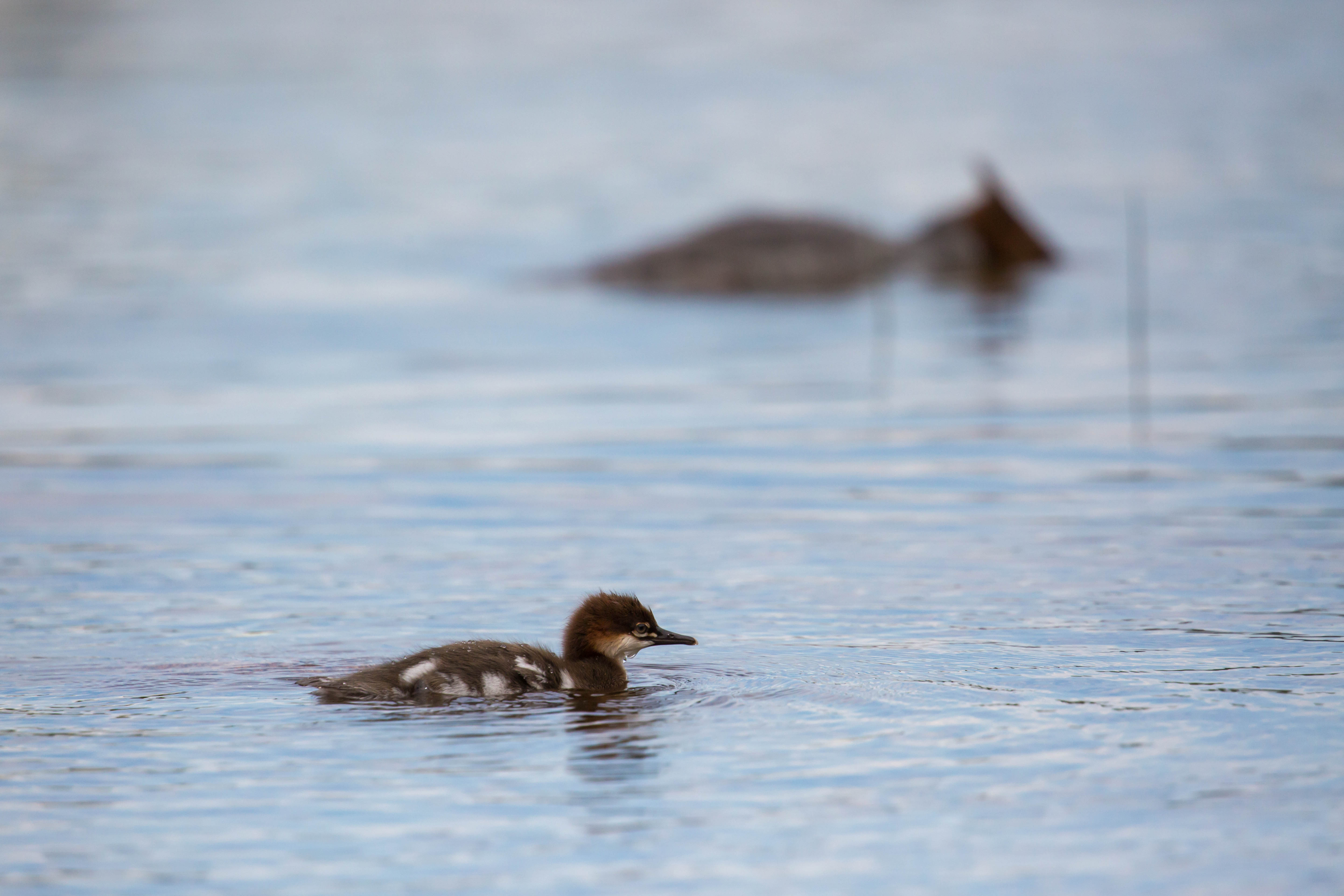
Common merganser chick and adult

The cape is home to many seasonal and year-round birds, including shorebirds, songbirds, and birds of prey. Among them are bald eagles, ospreys, kestrels, and several species of hawks. Barred owls and pileated woodpeckers also live on the cape. Common songbirds include phoebes, nuthatches, black-capped chickadees, and robins. Bank swallows nest on nearby Western Island. On the water, terns, gulls, and cormorants are abundant, and buffleheads, black guillemots, loons, kingfishers and mergansers are also seen regularly. Islands off the cape are important nesting sites for gulls, eiders, and black guillemots. Seals and porpoises live in the waters surrounding the cape, along with sea creatures like clams, mussels, lobster, crabs, starfish, sea urchins, and horseshoe crabs.

== Climate ==
Cape Rosier, Maine

Climate chart (precipitation, max. and min. temperature)
J	F	M	A	M	J	J	A	S	O	N	D
4.2 30 13	3.4 32 15	4.2 39 23	4.3 51 33	3.8 61 43	4.2 70 52	3.2 76 58	3.1 75 58	4 68 51	5.4 56 41	4.8 45 31	4.9 36 21
- █ Average max. and min. temperatures in °F
- █ Precipitation totals in inches
Metric conversion
J	F	M	A	M	J	J	A	S	O	N	D
107 −1 −10	85 0 −10	105 4 −5	109 10 1	96 16 6	108 21 11	81 25 15	78 24 14	101 20 10	136 13 5	122 7 −1	125 2 −6
- █ Average max. and min. temperatures in °C
- █ Precipitation totals in mm

The climate is classified as humid continental (Köppen: Dfb), with warm summers and long, cold, snowy winters. Its warmest and driest months are July and August, and coldest are January and February. Precipitation is relatively evenly distributed year-round. Prevailing winds come from the south in summer and from the northwest in winter.

According to a 1942 report by the U.S. Bureau of Mines, seasonal temperatures averaged 65 °F in summer and 22 °F in winter, with records of 95 °F and -25 °F. Comparing to the 1991-2020 averages, winter temperatures have increased by 2 °F (to an average of 24 °F), but the average summer temperature remained the same. (Note: Since global warming has accelerated dramatically, recent temperatures are underestimated by the 1991-2020 averages.) Annual precipitation has also increased. The 1942 report noted an average of 45 inches (1,100 mm), compared to a recent average of 49 inches (1,200 mm). Cumulative snowfall occasionally reaches several feet deep.

The tidal range (the difference in sea level from low to high tide) can be as much as 14 feet. The highest tides are in winter, especially during nor'easters. Sea level is rising due to effects of global warming such as land ice melt, changes in ocean currents, thermal expansion of sea water, and changes in the land's saturation of water. From 1950 to 2016, sea level rose by 8 inches (200 mm) in Maine. The rate of sea level rise is accelerating; scientists estimate an inch increase every six to eight years.

== History of settlement ==
Indigenous peoples are thought to have inhabited the region around Cape Rosier for as long as 11,000 years. People living on the coast ate seafood such as clams, mussels, and fish, and may have hunted marine mammals such as seals. They also gathered and processed bird eggs, berries, nuts, and roots. Ancient remains of campsites dating back millennia have been found on Penobscot Bay's shores and islands. Archaeological finds include 2,000-year-old artifacts on Hog Island and Pond Island, off the south coast of Cape Rosier, and midden heaps (shell piles) indicating the importance of shellfish as sustenance. Based on archaeological evidence from the nearby Blue Hill peninsula, the area's inhabitants as of the 12th century were part of a trade network extending far north and south along the Atlantic coast.

=== Penobscot peoples ===
The land has historically been the home of the Penobscot, an Eastern Abenaki-speaking tribe belonging to the Wabanaki Confederacy. The Penobscot (Abenaki: Pαnawάhpskewi) people are today one of five federally- and state-recognized tribes in Maine, with about 2,300 enrolled members.

Traditionally, Penobscot and other coastal peoples hunted, fished, and grew crops like maize (corn), squash, and climbing beans. Birch bark canoes (made from a single piece of bark from white birches) were once a primary mode of transportation along the coast for people of the Wabanaki Confederacy nations. Basket weaving, traditionally a task done by women, was for practical use, but after the 16th century Penobscot women also wove "fancy baskets" for trade with Europeans. Baskets are woven with sweet grass, brown ash, and birch bark, species that grow in Maine wetlands but are currently threatened by habitat destruction and the decimation of ash forests by the invasive emerald ash borer.

It is disputed whether or not Vikings came as far south as Maine in their travels to North America from Greenland, although it is known that they encountered indigenous people on the coast in the 11th or 12th century. A Norse coin was found at the Goddard archaeological site about 12 miles from Cape Rosier, but its provenance is disputed. Scholars believe it was brought to the area through trade with people further north on the coast, rather than indicating the presence of Norse explorers. More likely, Penobscot peoples began to encounter Europeans in the 16th century.

Although few people of Penobscot origin have lived on Cape Rosier in recent times, Algonquian-origin names are known. Cape Rosier was called Moosikatchik, which is translated as "a moose's rump", for a moosecalf killed by Glooscap. One historian noted that place names of Algonquian language origin in Hancock and Washington counties "frequently suggest great struggles. For example, a submerged vein of white quartz off Cape Rosier is said to resemble water-soaked moose entrails. Called Oolaghesee or "the entrails," it is supposedly the remains of a moose calf killed in ancient times by the legendary ... hero Glooscap."

=== English colonists ===
Early recorded contact between Penobscot people and English colonists took place in 1605. Cape Rosier (formerly also Cape Rozier) was named for James Rosier, an English priest and member of a colonial expedition to the Penobscot River region. According to an 1886 history,

"Martin Pring and Captain Weymouth, the English explorers, sailed along its shores in 1603 and 1605. ... There is a tradition that Rosier, the historian of Weymouth's expedition, explored Deer Island thoroughfare, making a halt at the bold promontory in Brooksville, known as Cape Rosier. They found the county occupied by a tribe of Indians, who with those on Passamaquoddy waters, were noted for their long journeys in canoes..."

A report of the voyage, written by James Rosier was published soon after the Englishmen returned from their expedition, bringing with them five captives from the Penobscot region. Rosier's pamphlet described the physical resources available to settlers on the islands and coast of Maine (harbors, rivers, soil, trees, wild fruit and vegetables, and so forth). Rosier wrote that Monhegan was "woody, growen with Firre, Birch, Oke and Beech, as farre as we say along the shore; and so likely to be within. On the verge grow Gooseberries, Strawberries, Wild pease, and Wilde rose bushes."

French colonists claimed the territory now eastern Maine, and in 1613 built Fort Pentagouet fort at what is now Castine, lying across the Bagaduce River just north of Cape Rosier. The settlement was an important French trading post for fur, timber, and fishing, and served as the capital of Acadia from 1670 to 1674. The town changed hands many times among French, English and Dutch colonists over the course of the 17th century.

Most who settled on Cape Rosier in the 1700s were of English descent, and most were farmers or fishermen, along with boatbuilders, some of them employed across the water in Castine, Maine. In the 1800s, farmers from the Cape grazed their sheep on nearby islands, including Hog and Western Island, the latter of which is not known to have ever had sustained inhabitation. Western and Pond Islands were also used to hunt sandpipers, which were then abundant, for sport. Weir fishing was also a common activity around the cape and islands, and is the origin of the name of Weir Cove. In the mid- to late-1800s, vacationers in Castine took a ferry across the mouth of the Bagaduce River for day excursions around the cape.

=== Modern history and economy ===
Presently there is a census-designated place at the unincorporated village of Harborside. The town of Brooksville has a total population of under 1,000 people, with a much smaller number living on Cape Rosier itself. As of the 2020 U.S. Census, the population of the Harborside zip code area was 201. Almost all residents of the town are White, especially of English, Scots-Irish, and French origin, as is true of much of the Maine population. Many members of the Penobscot and other indigenous peoples of Maine live on state reservations, such as the Penobscot Indian Island Reservation.

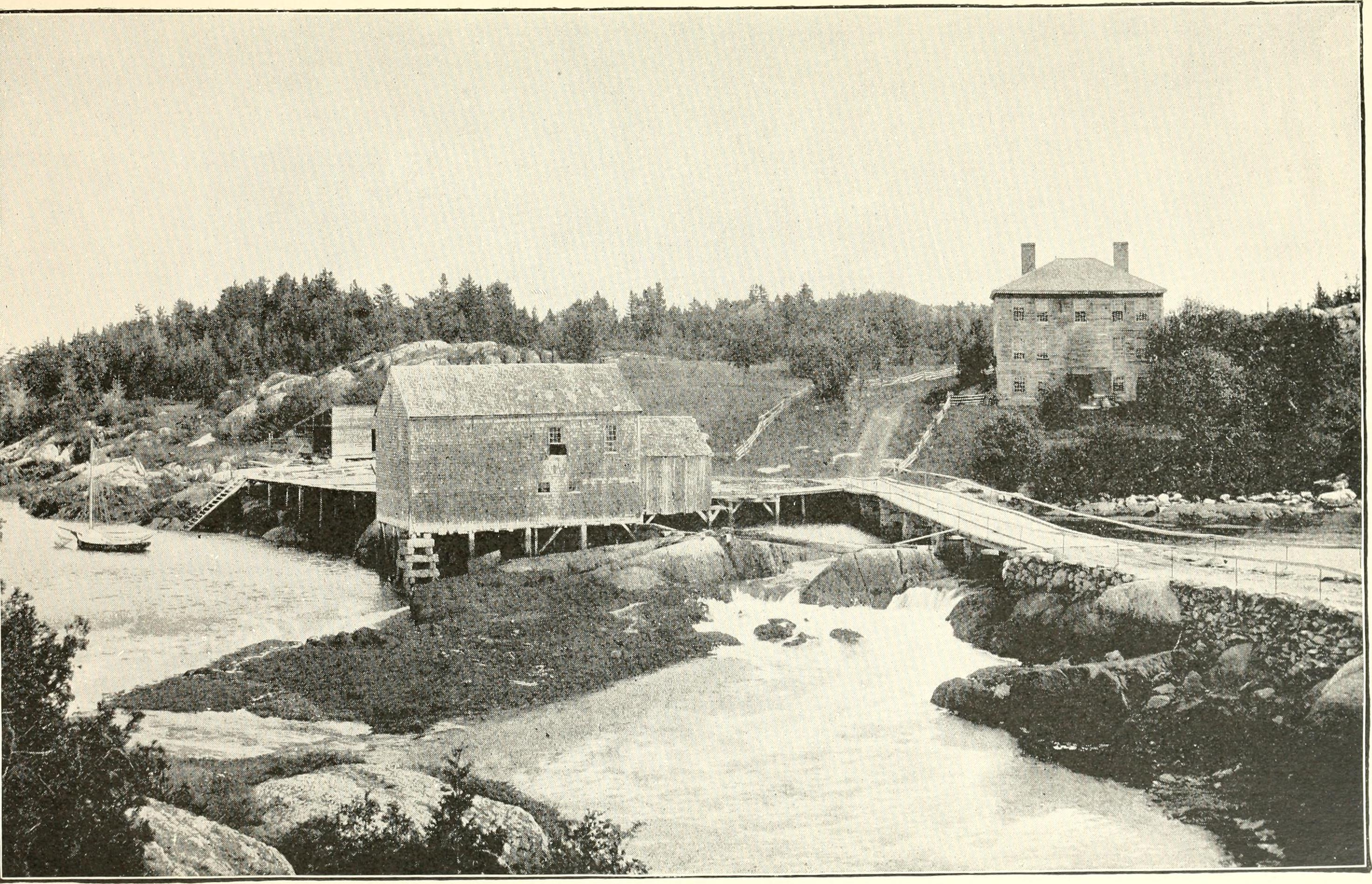
Goose Falls, Cape Rosier (1891)

Around the era of the mining frenzy in the Western United States, in 1880 a copper vein was found near Goose Falls, a tidal estuary a quarter-mile southwest of Harborside (at 44° 21' N., 68° 48.5' W.). It is said that a clam digger at Goose Pond discovered zinc-copper sulfide ore deposits at low tide. The mine at Goose Falls produced 10,000 tons of crude ore between July 1881 and September 1883, containing 20% zinc, 3% copper and some lead. The ore was hand-sorted and about 3,000 tons were shipped from the site. However, the operation closed down in 1887 and the mine was abandoned, remaining inoperative for about half a century thereafter.

The U.S. Bureau of Mines investigated the site for re-opening in 1942, when the demand for metals was high due to World War II. Investigators in the 1940s and 1950s determined that the ore contained zinc, copper, lead, arsenic, and cadmium. The Maine Legislature passed laws that permitted two dams to be constructed in 1967, which made it possible to drain the Goose Pond estuary for open pit mining. Intensive mining from 1968 to 1972 left the cove severely contaminated, and in 1972 the Callahan Mining Corporation ended operations. The mine was designated a Superfund site in 2001, under a federal environmental remediation program to clean up highly polluted tracts of land managed by the EPA. Today, the former pit mine is flooded, submerged within the Goose Pond estuary; and the remediation process remains ongoing.

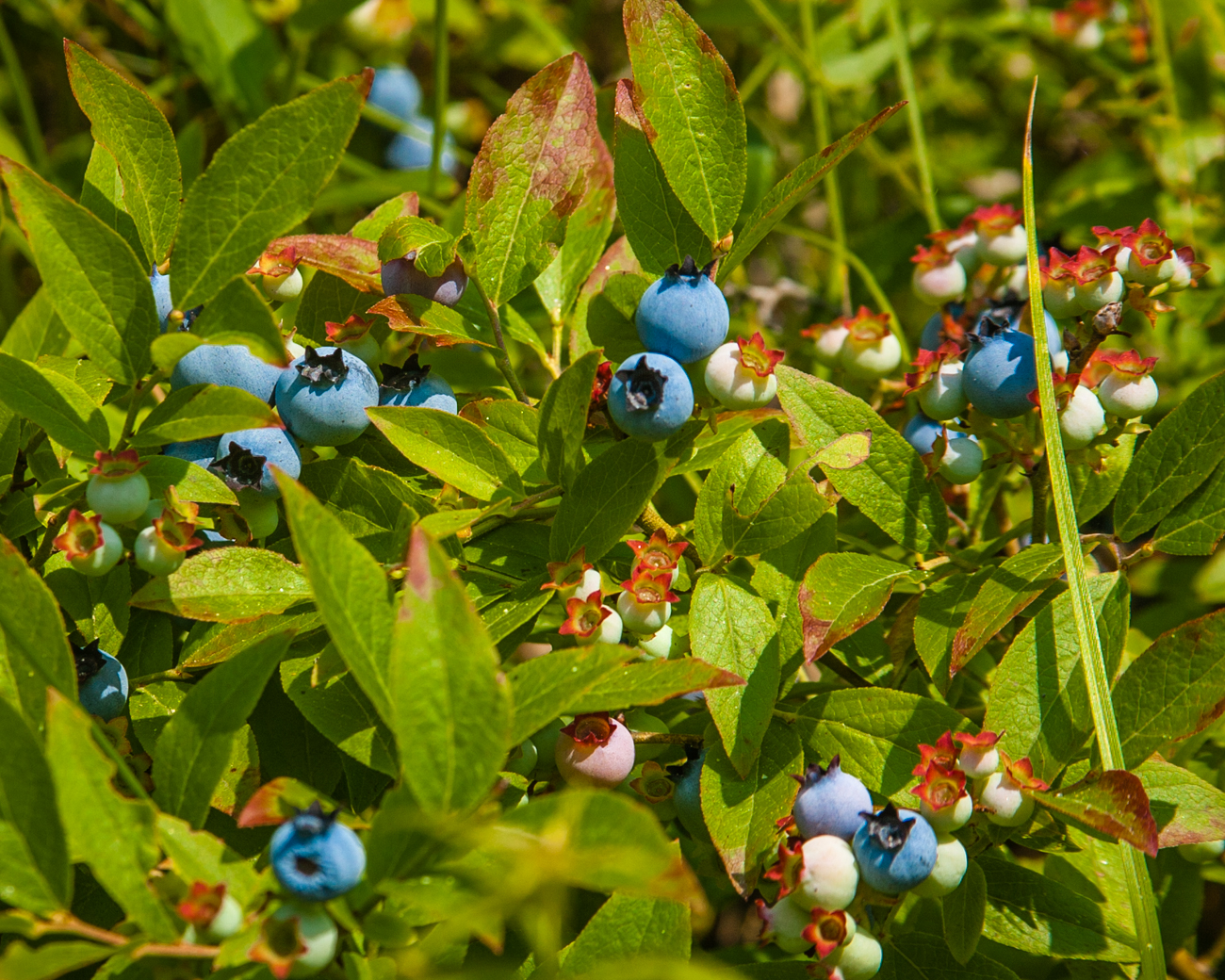
Wild blueberry bush in Maine.

Cape Rosier was home to Helen Nearing and her husband Scott Nearing, pioneers of environmentalism, vegetarianism, and organic farming who built a homestead and farmed on the cape in the mid-20th century. In 1954, the couple published Living the Good Life, a book widely read and influential among young Americans of the 1960s and 1970s back-to-the-land movement.

Like others on Cape Rosier, the Nearings cultivated blueberries as a cash crop. Eliot Coleman, another well-known proponent and innovator in sustainable, organic methods for small farms and an agriculture researcher, operates a farm that produces year-round vegetable crops using minimally heated greenhouses and polytunnels. Lobster have historically been abundant in the waters around Cape Rosier. Lobster fishing has long been an important commercial activity and source of income for residents.

Tourism has been a source of income for the Cape's inhabitants, particularly as a summer destination for vacationers and seasonal residents, since the late 19th century. There is a 1,345 acres (5.44 km^{2}) nature preserve at Holbrook Island Sanctuary State Park containing several coastal ecosystems, including upland forest and meadows, ponds, wetland marshes, and rocky coastline. The park is managed by the Maine Department of Agriculture, Conservation and Forestry. The land is open for hiking, kayaking, and fishing, with 11 miles (18 km) of trails and several beaches where visitors can swim. At Bakeman Beach, on the southern coast of the cape, the Town of Brooksville acquired property in 2020, with cooperation from the Maine Coast Heritage Trust, to provide permanent public access to the shore.

== Demographics ==
The U.S. Census collects data for towns and for zip codes. There are about 200 inhabitants within the Harborside zip code (04642) as of 2020, up from 123 in the 2010 census. Harborside's tabulation area encompasses the cape to the west of Holbrook Island Sanctuary and the end of Weir Cove, as of 2020. The rest of the Cape's population is enumerated in the Brooksville zip code, so cannot be broken down into Cape and non-Cape inhabitants. The summer population is considerably higher.

Among the Harborside residents, the age distribution skews exceptionally high compared to the United States or Maine population overall: more than half the population is 65 years old and above. The population is also highly educated: almost two-thirds have a college degree, among adults aged 25 and above.

== See also ==
- List of birds of Maine
- Harborside, Maine
- Brooksville, Maine
- Hancock County, Maine
