= Topside =

Topside may refer to:

- Topside (Brooksville, Maine), a summer estate listed on the U.S. National Register of Historic Places
- Topside (Nauru), name given to the interior of the Pacific Island nation of Nauru
- A cut of beef in Britain, part of the round steak in American terminology
- Topside direction, in the list of ship directions
- A fictional organization in the BBC Canada Television show Orphan Black
- Topsides, the upper part of a ship or oil platform
- Topside (film), a 2020 American film
