= Eliot Coleman =

American farmer, author, organic farming proponent

- Born: 1938 (age 87–88)
- Occupations: farmer; author; educator
- Spouse: Barbara Damrosch
- Writing career
- Subject: organic farming
- Notable works: The New Organic Grower; Four-Season Harvest; The Winter Harvest Handbook
- Website: eliotbarbara.com

Eliot Coleman (born 1938) is an American farmer, author, agricultural researcher and educator, and proponent of organic farming. He wrote The New Organic Grower. He served for two years as Executive Director of the International Federation of Organic Agriculture Movements (IFOAM), and was an advisor to the U.S. Department of Agriculture during its 1979–80 study, Report and Recommendations on Organic Farming, a document that formed the basis for today's legislated National Organic Program (2002) in the U.S.

On his Four Season Farm in Harborside, Brooksville, Maine, on Cape Rosier, he produces year-round vegetable crops, even under harsh winter conditions (for which he uses unheated and minimally heated greenhouses and polytunnels). He even manages to grow artichokes, claiming that "I grow them just to make the Californians nervous."

Coleman is married to gardening author Barbara Damrosch. For several years, from 1993, they co-hosted the TV series, Gardening Naturally, on The Learning Channel. Coleman and his wife continue to grow and locally market fresh produce.

== Career ==
Coleman graduated from Williams College in 1961. In 1968, he and his first wife, Sue Coleman, moved to a farm in Maine, situated on land purchased from Helen and Scott Nearing, as part of the back-to-the-land movement. Their first child, Melissa Coleman, was born there the next year. Coleman taught himself how to farm organically in the harsh Maine climate, and developed many of the cold-weather growing techniques for which he is known. As did the Nearings, the Colemans developed their farm into a learning center for people interested in natural and sustainable agricultural practices.

In 1974, Coleman began periodically visiting farms in Europe to study techniques that might be adapted to the Northeastern United States. He has since made many such investigative tours. The market gardening farms of the Netherlands, France, and Germany have provided much inspiration.

The first edition of Coleman's The New Organic Grower was published in 1989. In 1995, the winter harvest aspect of his farming entered a new, more comprehensive phase, just as the second edition of the book was coming together. In the decades since, the winter harvest has inspired the creation of The Winter Harvest Handbook and has become one of his favorite areas of applied research.

== Organic farming principles ==
In his writing, Coleman promotes small-scale organic farming practices and sustainable agriculture. One of his central principles is "small is better," advocating business growth through improved production and marketing, rather than physical expansion. He also favors direct relationships with customers; the relationships can take many flexible forms, but he considers them more important societally than organic certification itself.

His principles also include favoring the biologic over the technologic, and the preventive over the corrective, when seeking solutions to agricultural challenges. He readily advocates technology wherever appropriate (including inventing new hand tools and agricultural machinery), but he tries to get the resiliency of life itself to prevent problems, in preference to using technology to fix them after they have developed. He thus favors soil health (via crop rotation and soil amendments) and locally optimized timing of sowing and harvest as keys to plant health that render most other pest control and plant disease control efforts unnecessary. He advocates accepting external forces (such as biologic and thermal realities) and using them to one's own advantage instead of fighting them with chemicals (as against soil deficiencies, plant diseases, insect pests, and weeds) or with fuel consumption (as against cold weather). It is this principle, as well as the gradual dilution of the connotations of the word organic, that leads him to prefer the word biologic rather than organic as the best description of his methods.

Like many organic farmers, Coleman advocates the prevention-not-treatment approach to weed control. He therefore favors fast, light, frequent cultivation with purpose-built hoe types, skimming weed seedlings off the soil surface with an action that is more like shaving than chopping (hoes "like razors rather than axes"). To that end, he developed the collinear hoe (or collineal hoe).

Coleman is a leader in developing and sharing the concept that in season extension a distinction can be made between extending the growing season and extending the harvest season.

Coleman has often turned to published agricultural research in seeking ways to continually improve his farming methods. He has pointed out that agricultural science has often shown a bias toward basic research but that applied research is more valuable to organic farmers. For example, although it is nice to investigate advanced chemistry, running trials on which compost recipe is most favored by a particular cultivar of Brassica, and a thousand other practical topics, represents important and valuable applied science. He has pointed out that such useful practical research was often done in the United States before 1940 but not as much since then. He has observed that Dutch organic farmers today do a lot of practical innovation and trials and share the information with each other, although much of this useful research never gets formally published. He relied on much self-education, including much library time, to bootstrap his knowledge, and he encourages his readers to do so as well.

The development of the big business phase of the organic food era has led Coleman, as well as others, to emphasize the ways in which small, local growers can have competitive advantages to keep their businesses strong. At one time just being organic was enough, but now something more is needed to compete. He thus points out that food should be local and next-day or same-day fresh, and that it is best for customers to have personal relationships with growers. On these points, large corporations with long-distance distribution cannot easily wipe out small business competition.

Beyond merely the question of who is able to compete on price, Coleman also explores the very difference between shallow organics and deep organics, which reaches all the way into discussion of economic systems and lifestyles. He questions the very ideas of people buying much stuff (including quick fixes to palliate problems, even despite their being organic), buying ultra-processed foods at all (even with the organic label), and using long supply chains full of intermediaries; he feels that such ideas are not a smart path to human health (which requires soil health) and are of questionable economic sustainability in that they promote the view of nature as a collection of problems to be solved with purchased palliatives (driving sales) instead of a positive force to be amplified to advantage and with which to align one's efforts. He advocates "real food" (biologic/organic, unprocessed, local, fresh, produced by small businesses).

== Personal life ==
During these years (early to mid-1970s), Coleman experienced hyperthyroidism. He was reluctant to follow medical advice, as he felt convinced that dietary choices should be able to help. Eventually, he took radioiodine therapy.

== Bibliography ==
- The New Organic Grower: A Master's Manual of Tools and Techniques for the Home and Market Gardener. 1989.
- Four-Season Harvest: How to Harvest Fresh Organic Vegetables from Your Home Garden All Year Long. 1992.
- The Winter-Harvest Manual: Farming the Back Side of the Calendar. 1998.
- Four-Season Harvest: Organic Vegetables from Your Home Garden All Year Long. 1999.
- The Winter Harvest Handbook: Year-Round Vegetable Production Using Deep-Organic Techniques and Unheated Greenhouses. 2009.
- The Four Season Farm Gardener's Cookbook: From the Garden to the Table in 120 Recipes. 2013. Co-authored with Barbara Damrosch.

== See also ==
- Greenhouse
- Polytunnel
- Winter gardening

Gardening method authors

- Mel Bartholomew (square foot gardening)
- Jean-Martin Fortier (sustainable gardening)
- Helen and Scott Nearing (simple living)
- Ruth Stout (no-till thick mulch gardening)
