= Brooksville, Maine =

Town in Maine, United States

- Town
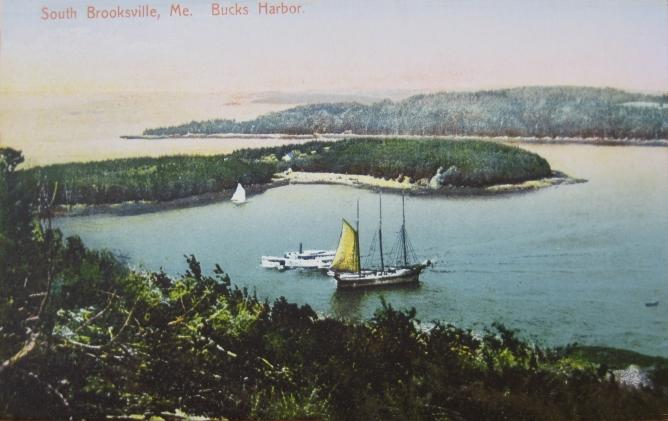
- View of Buck's Harbor c. 1910

- Location within Maine Location within the United States
- Coordinates: 44°22′07″N 68°44′34″W
- Country: United States
- State: Maine
- County: Hancock
- Incorporated: 1817
- Villages: Brooksville; Harborside; Herricks; North Brooksville; Norumbega; South Brooksville; West Brooksville

Area
  - Total: 51.12 sq mi (132.40 km^{2})
  - Land: 31.13 sq mi (80.63 km^{2})
  - Water: 19.99 sq mi (51.77 km^{2})
- Elevation: 82 ft (25 m)

Population (2020)
  - Total: 935
  - Density: 30/sq mi (11.6/km^{2})
- Time zone: UTC-5 (Eastern (EST))
  - Summer (DST): UTC-4 (EDT)
- ZIP Codes: 04617 (Brooksville); 04642 (Harborside)
- Area code: 207
- FIPS code: 23-07975
- GNIS feature ID: 582372
- Website: www.brooksvillemaine.org

Brooksville is a town on Penobscot Bay in Hancock County, Maine, United States. As of the 2020 census, the town population was 935. It contains the villages of North Brooksville, South Brooksville (on Buck's Harbor), West Brooksville, Brooksville Corner, and Harborside (on Cape Rosier).

== History ==
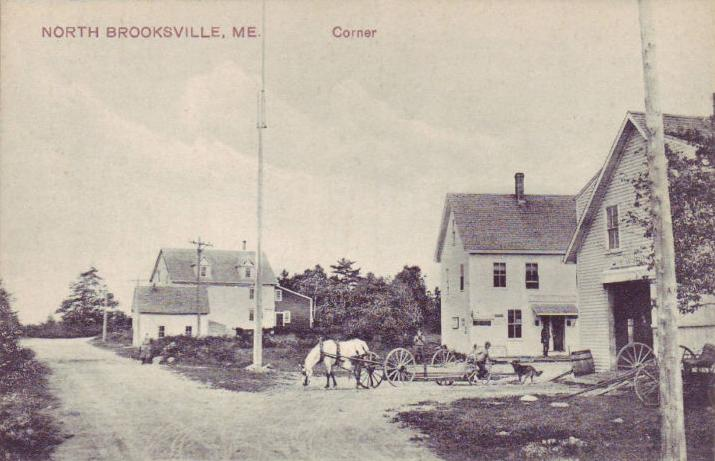
View of North Brooksville in 1908

The Brooksville area has likely been inhabited for over 11,000 years. In the centuries prior to European settler colonists arrival, Native Americans of the Wabanaki confederation lived in the region. The people living in the Brooksville area were probably Penobscot. According to the Brooksville Historical Society there is a story, difficult to confirm, that Englishmen massacred a Wabanaki village at Walker Pond some time between 1690 and 1704. Archaeologists found a grave of Native American origin on the northern edge of Walker Pond in 1912, but the date of the burial was not established.

Brooksville's first English settlers were John Wasson, Samuel Wasson and David Hawes, soldiers in the Revolutionary War. Incorporated on June 13, 1817, the town was formed from parts of Castine, Penobscot and Sedgwick. It was named Brooksville after Governor John Brooks of Massachusetts, who then governed Maine.

The surface of the town abounds with granite, and several quarries were established. The soil is a clay loam, which yielded wheat and potatoes. Buck's Harbor, safe and deep, is one of the best coves in the region for small boats, and many residents became involved in the coasting trade and fisheries. By 1880, when the population was 1,419, Brooksville had a porgy oil factory, two sawmills, a shingle mill, a planing mill, two gristmills, a wool carding mill, and a cloth and yarn factory. Shipping was an industry, with ship repairs done at the foot of Wasson's Wharf Road with a pier to the channel in the Bagaduce. There was a brickyard, blacksmith's shop, rope walk and small store for provisions. As late as 1912, there were 18 schooners at the wharf under repair. A small packet, the Goldenrod, ferried passengers from Brooksville to Castine and there was a pier to the south where the Belfast boat berthed. The Wasson and Tapley families, related by marriage, had numerous ship's captains, the most notable being the six Tapley sons of Captain Robert Tapley, who all followed the sea after their father.

Brooksville's Cape Rosier is named after James Rosier, an early explorer of the Penobscot River.

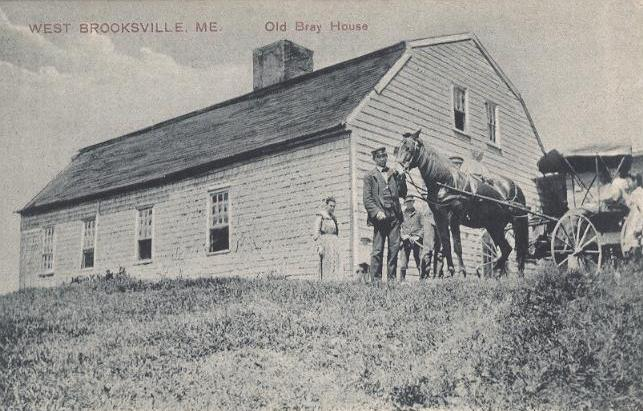
Old Bray House in 1908

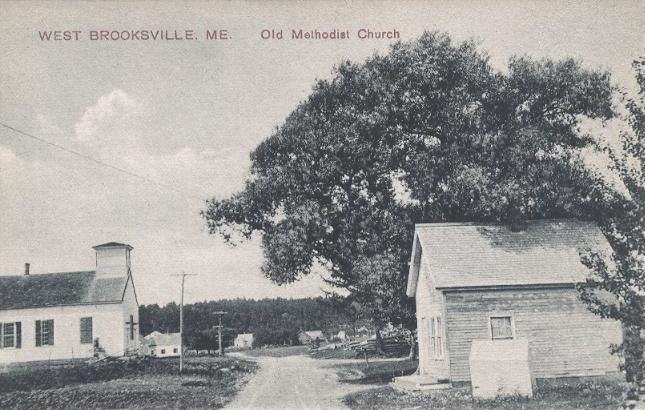
Methodist Church in 1908

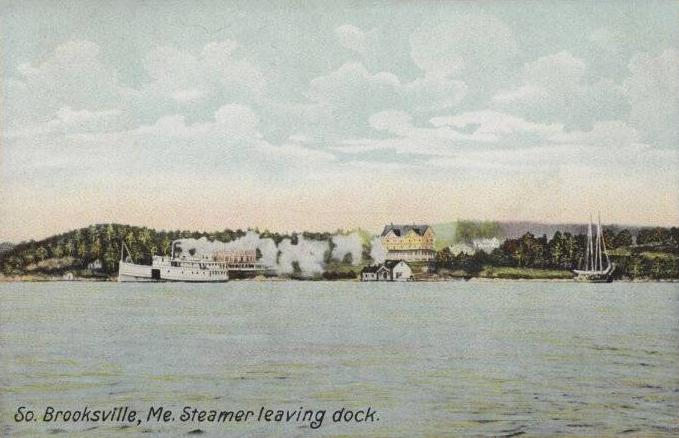
Steamboat leaving in 1909

== Geography ==
According to the United States Census Bureau, the town has a total area of 51.12 square miles (132.40 km^{2}), of which 31.13 square miles (80.63 km^{2}) is land and 19.99 square miles (51.77 km^{2}) is water. Brooksville is bounded on the west by Penobscot Bay, on the north and east by the Bagaduce River, a tidal estuary, and on the south by Eggemoggin Reach. It is nearly an island, with just two slim land bridges to the rest of the mainland, and has 53.75 miles (86.50 km) of shoreline.

Brooksville is crossed by state routes 175 and 176.

== Demographics ==
Historical population
Census	Pop.	Note	%±
1820	972		—
1830	1,089		12.0%
1840	1,246		14.4%
1850	1,333		7.0%
1860	1,428		7.1%
1870	1,275		−10.7%
1880	1,419		11.3%
1890	1,310		−7.7%
1900	1,171		−10.6%
1910	1,176		0.4%
1920	1,019		−13.4%
1930	810		−20.5%
1940	805		−0.6%
1950	751		−6.7%
1960	603		−19.7%
1970	673		11.6%
1980	753		11.9%
1990	760		0.9%
2000	911		19.9%
2010	934		2.5%
2020	935		0.1%
U.S. Decennial Census

=== 2010 census ===
As of the census of 2010, there were 934 people, 437 households, and 292 families living in the town. The population density was 30.0 inhabitants per square mile (11.6/km^{2}). There were 934 housing units at an average density of 30.0 per square mile (11.6/km^{2}). The racial makeup of the town was 95.6% White, 0.2% Native American, 1.9% Asian, 0.5% from other races, and 1.7% from two or more races. Hispanic or Latino of any race were 1.1% of the population.

There were 437 households, of which 20.4% had children under the age of 18 living with them, 57.0% were married couples living together, 6.9% had a female householder with no husband present, 3.0% had a male householder with no wife present, and 33.2% were non-families. 26.1% of all households were made up of individuals, and 11.2% had someone living alone who was 65 years of age or older. The average household size was 2.14 and the average family size was 2.52.

The median age in the town was 53 years. 15.3% of residents were under the age of 18; 5.8% were between the ages of 18 and 24; 18% were from 25 to 44; 35.7% were from 45 to 64; and 25.2% were 65 years of age or older. The gender makeup of the town was 48.0% male and 52.0% female.

=== 2000 census ===
As of the census of 2000, there were 911 people, 412 households, and 278 families living in the town. The population density was 29.3 inhabitants per square mile (11.3/km^{2}). There were 791 housing units at an average density of 25.4 per square mile (9.8/km^{2}). The racial makeup of the town was 98.68% White, 0.44% Asian, 0.22% Pacific Islander, and 0.66% from two or more races. Hispanic or Latino of any race were 0.33% of the population.

There were 412 households, out of which 23.1% had children under the age of 18 living with them, 60.7% were married couples living together, 4.9% had a female householder with no husband present, and 32.5% were non-families. 26.2% of all households were made up of individuals, and 11.7% had someone living alone who was 65 years of age or older. The average household size was 2.21 and the average family size was 2.65.

In the town, the population was spread out, with 18.0% under the age of 18, 5.3% from 18 to 24, 21.3% from 25 to 44, 34.8% from 45 to 64, and 20.6% who were 65 years of age or older. The median age was 49 years. For every 100 females, there were 100.2 males. For every 100 females age 18 and over, there were 95.5 males.

The median income for a household in the town was $36,458, and the median income for a family was $41,875. Males had a median income of $26,923 versus $24,750 for females. The per capita income for the town was $23,565. About 7.6% of families and 9.7% of the population were below the poverty line, including 13.5% of those under age 18 and 2.2% of those age 65 or over.

== Points of interest ==
- Bagaduce Lunch, a James Beard Foundation Award winning clam shack.
- Brooksville Historical Society Museum
- Callahan mine. See the list of superfund sites in Maine.
- Four Season Farm, the nationally known organic farm of Eliot Coleman and Barbara Damrosch.
- Good Life Center, the hand-built last home of Helen and Scott Nearing, dedicated to advancing their vision of social justice and simple living.
- Holbrook Island Sanctuary State Park, a protected natural area on Penobscot Bay for hiking and wildlife watching.
- The reversing falls on the Bagaduce River at Davis Narrows, where Routes 175 and 176 cross the river.
- The reversing falls at Goose Pond in Harborside.

== National historic sites ==
- The Good Life Center, added to National Register of Historic Places February 2026.
- Topside, added to the National Register of Historic Places August 13, 1975.
- Von Mach Site, added to the National Register of Historic Places January 17, 1989.
- West Brooksville Congregational Church, added to the National Register of Historic Places June 20, 1995.

== Education ==
It is in the Brooksville School District. Brooksville Elementary School is a PreK-8 school. That school is a part of School Union 93.

Brooksville pays George Stevens Academy, an independent school in Blue Hill, to educate its students at the high school level.

== Notable people ==
- Eliot Coleman, farmer, author, agricultural researcher and educator, and proponent of organic farming
- Melissa Coleman, author, columnist, and writer
- Clarence Milville Condon, Medal of Honor recipient during the Philippine–American War
- Archibald Cox, Harvard law professor, 31st United States Solicitor General
- Daniel Hoffman, poet laureate of the United States, 1973–1974
- Edmund von Mach, German-American art historian
- John Mack, Civil War seaman, Medal of Honor recipient
- Robert McCloskey, award-winning author and illustrator of children's books
- Helen Nearing, wife of Scott Nearing, advocates of simple living, and leaders of the back-to-the-land movement
- Scott Nearing, husband of Helen Nearing
- Clara Parkes, author, yarn critic, and wool expert
- Charles H. Perkins, state legislator, Grange store manager, and sea captain
- DeForest H. Perkins, superintendent of schools of Skowhegan and Portland and Ku Klux Klan in Maine leader
- Robert Shetterly, painter, Americans Who Tell The Truth
- Peter Suber, a leader in the movement for open access to research
- Lucy Hale Tapley, American educator and president of Spelman College
- David Atwood Wasson, early American intellectual leader
