= West Brooksville Congregational Church =

Historic church in Maine, United States

- U.S. National Register of Historic Places
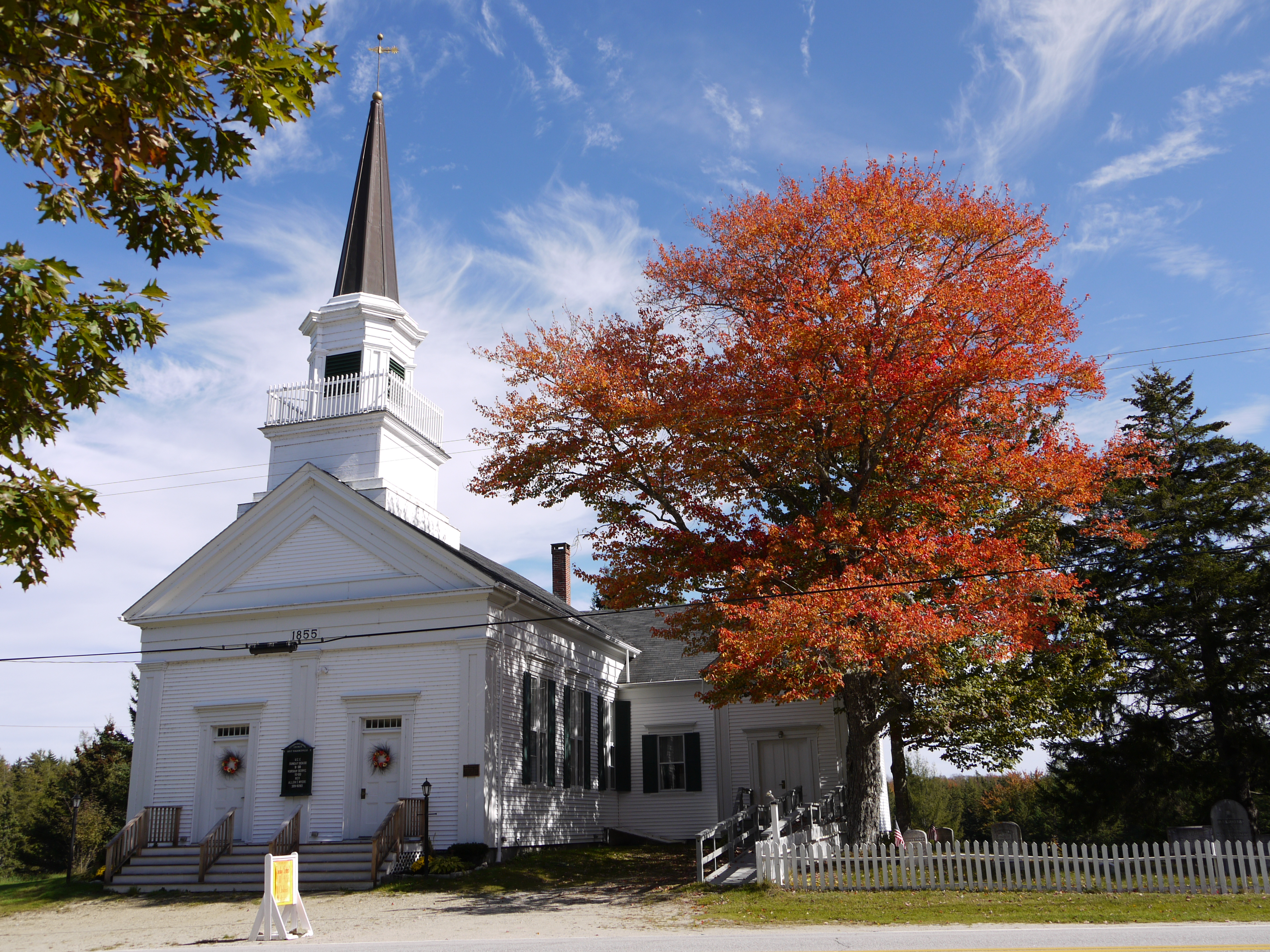

- Location within Maine Location within the United States
- Location: SR 176 (Coastal Road) E side, 1 mi. NW of jct. with Varnum Rd., West Brooksville, Maine
- Coordinates: 44°23′42″N 68°45′28″W
- Area: less than one acre
- Built: 1855
- Architect: Jesse Gardner; Thomas Lord
- Architectural style: Greek Revival
- NRHP reference No.: 95000727
- Added to NRHP: June 20, 1995

West Brooksville Congregational Church is an historic church in West Brooksville, Maine on the east side of SR 176 (Coastal Road), 1 mile (1.6 km) northwest of the junction with Varnum Road. Built in 1855 for a congregation established in 1812, the present church building is a fine local example of Greek Revival architecture, and was listed on the National Register of Historic Places in 1995. The congregation is affiliated with the United Church of Christ; worship is held every Sunday mornings at 10 a.m. Sunday School begins at 9 a.m. Communion is served the first Sunday of every month.

== Architecture and history ==
The church is set on the east side of SR 176, on a rise a short way south of the rural village of West Brooksville in northwestern Brooksville. It is a single-story wood frame structure with well-preserved exterior and interior Greek Revival elements. The main facade, which faces west, has symmetrically-placed entrances, each flanked by pilasters and topped by a transom window and entablature. The entrances are separated by taller pilasters, which are also found at the corners, supporting an entablature and a full triangular pediment. Rising above the entrances is the tower, which begins with square stages topped by a sawn balustrade, which encircles the octagonal belfry. Four sides of the belfry have louvered openings, with pilasters rising to an entablature, above which the octagonal steeple rises to a spire. A vestry has been added on to the nave, projecting to the right from the rear. Interior decoration includes molded window surrounds adorned with rosettes and vines, paneled pilasters flanking the doorways to the nave and the chancel. The nave retains original pews; its metal ceiling is a late-19th century alteration. The interior suffered some damaged in a 1982 fire, but this has been restored.

The West Brooksville congregation was organized in 1812, meeting for many years in a building shared with a school and town meetings. The congregation authorized construction of the present building in 1854, and it was completed in 1855. Credit for its design is conventionally given to Thomas Gardner, a local master builder, but Thomas Lord, a noted master builder from Blue Hill may have played a significant role; he is credited with the construction of a number other area churches whose designs bear some resemblance to this one.

== See also ==
- National Register of Historic Places listings in Hancock County, Maine
