= Edmund von Mach =

American art historian (1870–1927)

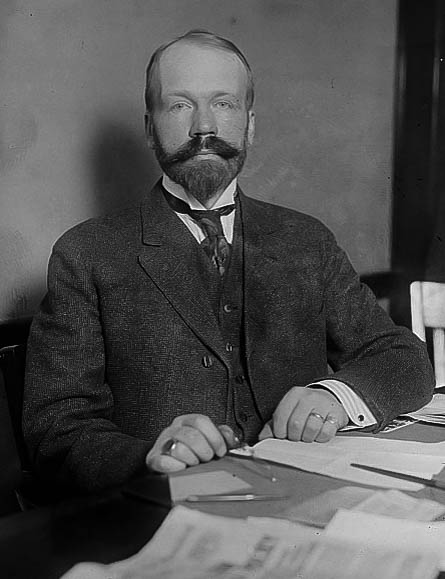
Edmund von Mach in 1915

Edmund von Mach (August 1, 1870 – July 15, 1927) was a German-American art historian and lecturer on art.

== Life and career ==
He was born on August 1, 1870, in Jawory, Pomerania, eastern Prussia (now Poland).

He came to America in 1891, and was educated at Harvard University (A.B., 1895; A.M., 1896; Ph.D., 1900), where he was an instructor in fine arts from 1899 to 1903. He was also an instructor in the history of art at Wellesley College from 1899 to 1902, and thereafter lectured on the same subject at Bradford Academy. He is the author of Greek Sculpture: Its Spirit and Principles (1903); A Handbook of Greek and Roman Sculpture (1904); Outlines of the History of Painting (1905); The Art of Painting in the Nineteenth Century (1908). Of the Allgemeines Lexikon der bildenden Künstler he became American editor. After the outbreak (1914) of the World War I he endeavored to foster a pro-German sentiment among Americans, and with this object in view wrote What Germany Wants (1914) and translated Paul Rohrbach's Der Deutsche Gedanke in der Welt as German World Politics (1915). In March, 1915, he debated questions of the war with Cecil Chesterton at Carnegie Hall, New York.

He died on July 15, 1927, at the Eastern Maine General Hospital in Bangor, Maine, following an operation for appendicitis.

== Legacy ==
In the 1910s and 1920s, an important archaeological site, now called the Von Mach Site, was excavated by Warren K. Moorehead on von Mach's property in Brooksville, Maine. The site was added to the National Register of Historic Places on January 17, 1989.
