= Gardening Naturally =

- Country of origin: United States
- Original language: English
- No. of episodes: 52

Gardening Naturally is a TV show series hosted by Barbara Damrosch and Eliot Coleman. It was created from 1993 to 1994 and ran until about 2003. It first aired on TLC (The Learning Channel) and later reruns were shown on Discovery Home and Leisure.

== Episodes ==
Over 50 episodes, covering all aspects of gardening were produced.

== Cast, Producers, Location ==
=== Hosts ===
- Eliot Coleman
- Barbara Damrosch

=== Production ===
- David Fuller - producer & director
- Jan Craige Singer - executive producer
- Philip Cormier - series cinematography
- Roger Cropley II - series film editing

=== Location ===
- Filming locations in USA: Harborside, Maine; Boston, Massachusetts; Cambridge, Massachusetts; Gorham, Maine; Fairfield, Maine.
