= Melissa Coleman =

American author, columnist, and writer

- Born: 1969 (age 56–57)
- Occupations: Author; columnist; writer

Melissa Coleman (born 1969) is an American author and columnist best known as the author of This Life Is in Your Hands, a childhood memoir exploring her iconic family's search for a sustainable lifestyle.

Coleman was born in Brooksville, Maine to parents Sue and Eliot Coleman of the Back-to-the-land movement of the 60s and 70s, and her parents have been referred to as disciples of Scott and Helen Nearing. Coleman is a columnist for Maine and Maine Home and Design magazines, and serves on the board of the Telling Room, a Portland, Maine writing center for kids. Coleman lives in Freeport, Maine, with her twin daughters.

== Bibliography ==
Non-fiction

- This Life Is in Your Hands: One Dream, Sixty Acres, and a Family Undone (2011)
