= George Weymouth =

English explorer of North America

Captain George Weymouth
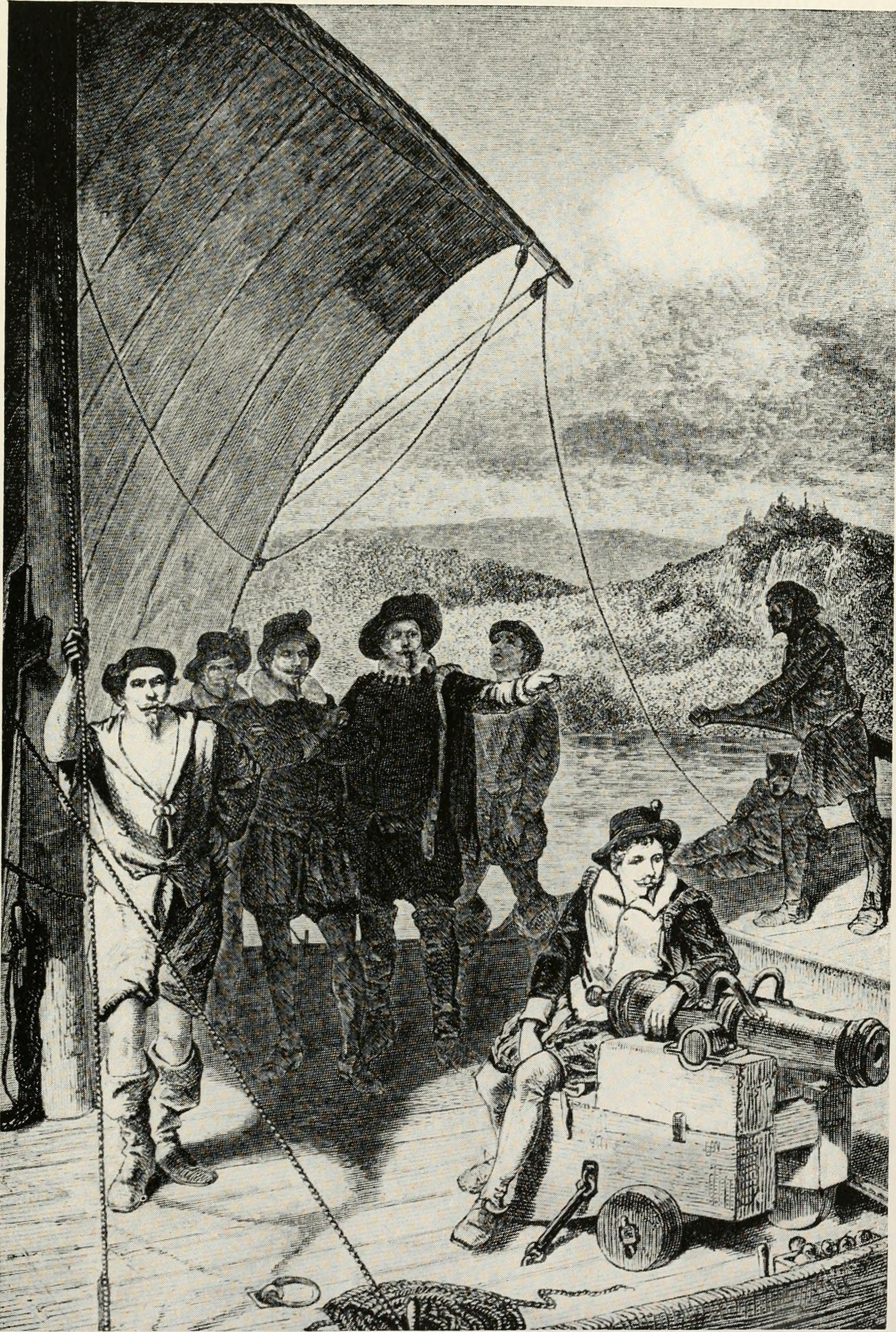
- Weymouth and crew skirting the coast of Maine
- Born: c. 1585; Cockington, Devon, Kingdom of England
- Died: c. 1612
- Other name: George Waymouth
- Occupations: Explorer, sea captain

George Weymouth (c. 1585 – c. 1612) was an English explorer and colonist of the area now occupied by the state of Maine. George Weymouth was a native of Cockington, Devon, who spent his youth studying shipbuilding and mathematics. His travels are among the early recorded contacts between Wabanaki nations and people of Northern Europe.

== Voyages ==
In 1602 Weymouth was hired to seek a northwest passage to India by the recently formed East India Company. He sailed the ship Discovery three hundred miles into Hudson Strait but turned back on July 26, as the year was far spent and many men were ill. Weymouth reached Dartmouth on September 5, 1602.

=== 1605 expedition ===
In March 1605, members of the English nobility, Thomas Arundell and Henry Wriothesley, sent Captain Weymouth to found a colony in "Virginia" (the location Virginia referring to the lands of the entire eastern coastline of North America not ruled by France or Spain) under the ruse of searching again for a Northwest Passage. Weymouth sailed from England on March 31, 1605, on the ship Archangel and landed near Monhegan off the coast of Maine on May 17, 1605. Using an assembled pinnace called The Light Horseman, Weymouth explored the now-known Penobscot Bay and inlets.

A report of the voyage, written by James Rosier (hired by Arundell to make detailed observations), was published soon after the men returned from their expedition. The pamphlet described the physical resources available to settlers on the islands and coast of Maine (harbors, rivers, soil, trees, wild fruit and vegetables, and so forth). James Rosier would write that Monhegan was "woody, growen with Firre, Birch, Oke and Beech, as farre as we say along the shore; and so likely to be within. On the verge grow Gooseberries, Strawberries, Wild pease, and Wilde rose bushes."

Rosier also recounts the crew's encounters with the indigenous peoples living in the Maine coastal region around Penobscot Bay, likely members of Eastern Abenaki-speaking nations, (Note: Based on the foreign words that Rosier listed in his report, Goddard concluded that the indigenous people the expedition encountered spoke Eastern Abenaki. The speakers, therefore, might have been Penobscot, Passamaquoddy or members of smaller societies like the Micmac or Maliseet.) which began eleven days after the Archangel first moored among the Georges Islands, on May 30, 1605. The ship was anchored in Muscongus Bay, and the captain and thirteen men had gone off in the shallop to explore. The report tells how the remaining crew had a chance encounter that afternoon with a hunting party, developed a sign language with them, and over several days encouraged their trust with gifts and then trade. (Note: At about 5:00 p.m. on May 30, the remaining 14 men on board the Archangel spied three canoes and convinced three individuals from them to come aboard. The English sailors showed them iron knives, combs, glasses, bracelets, rings and "other triffles". "We found them then (as after) a people of exceeding good intention, quicke understanding and readie capacitie." Having developed a sign language to communicate with them, Rosier persuaded them to spend the night near the ship, and the next day after providing breakfast for them, he made them to understand that if they returned with skins the English would trade knives and other desirable items for them.)

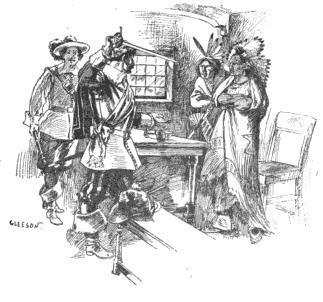
Illustration of a story of Captain Weymouth demonstrating a sword he magnetized by means of a lodestone to indigenous people at Pemaquid, Maine (now Bristol).

On his return, Weymouth joined the gathering, offering the Abenaki people bread and peas, with which they were unfamiliar, and showing them a sword magnetized with a lodestone. After three days of hospitality and trading, Rosier suggested that the crew visit their homes to trade. (Note: Captain Weymouth returned that morning (May 31), and shortly after noon the Abenaki returned in four canoes with items to trade. A rain prevented commerce on land, but after it subsided the Captain invited several people on board, giving one a shirt and the others gowns to dry in from the rain. After sharing sugar candy and raisins (among other things), the traders shared a meal of bread and fish on the ship. The next morning, Rosier and five other English men traded with twenty-eight locals. The captain and crew entertained them the rest of the day, with Rosier intriguing them by writing down their names for things and the captain slightly alarming them with his magnetized sword. That night several Abenakis slept aboard the ship while one sailor stayed ashore, where it is reported that he witnessed a two-hour pow-wow. June 2 being Sabbath Rosier "signed they should depart, and at the next Sun rising we would goe along with them to their houses; which they understood (as we thought) and departed …" That evening three canoes came to the vessel bearing tobacco, and another night of apparently amicable hospitality ensued.)

Rosier wrote that cultivating their trust was part of the plan to colonize once they had decided that the land was prime for European settlement. (Note: "Thus because we found the land a place answereable to the intent of our discovery, viz. fit for any nation to inhabit, we used the people with as great kindness as we could devise, or found them capable of.")

=== Kidnapping of Abenaki people ===
On June 3, as they themselves had suggested, the English set out to visit their homes. They became skittish when a large assembly came to escort them and decided not to go.

Rosier claimed that they then decided to kidnap a number of Abenaki people, based on their belief that the Abenaki people intended "mischief." (Note: Early the next morning the Abenaki people who slept ashore prevailed upon the captain to accompany them to the mainland where they would trade (as Rosier had suggested the day before). Weymouth took fifteen men with eight rowers to the mainland. Instead of disembarking, the English arranged to send a scout (holding a hostage for security). The scout reported that there were 280 men with bows and arrows and tamed wolves, but no merchandise. The English immediately suspected a trap.)

These things considered, we began to joyne them in the ranke of other Salvages, who have beene by travellers in most discoveries found very trecherous [sic]; never attempting mischiefe, until by some remisnesse, fit opportunity affordeth them certain ability to execute the same. Wherefore after good advise taken we determined so soone as we could to take some of them, least (being suspicious we had discovered their plots) they should absent themselves from us.

On the next day, they abducted five people, three by duplicity and two through physical violence. (Note: On June 3 Abenaki visited the vessel again, and three went aboard. Rosier and eight other English men went on land to pretend to trade with the other three. One took flight, and the ships crew "used little delay, but suddenly laid hands upon them". The two Abenaki people struggled mightily "it was as much as five or sixe of us could doe to get them into the light horsemen" where they were borne to the ship and all five were shunted off to the lower deck, where they remained as Weymouth continued exploring.) In discussing the forcible kidnapping of two people, Rosier noted that the kidnapping had been long planned, saying that they would have resorted to harsher methods to secure their captives because the capture of indigenous people was "a matter of great importance for the full accomplement [sic] of our voyage".

The idea was undoubtedly conceived by the entrepreneurs back in England as a way to become familiar with the land and inhabitants that they intended to colonize. The plan operated, however, at cross-purposes with their attempt to create good will. Weymouth and his crew made no secret of their abductions, though among some indigenous communities they were thought to have killed instead of kidnapped the five; not long after Weymouth's crew had left, French explorer Samuel de Champlain, sailing from the north, met a man named Anaffon, a minor trader in furs, at Monhegan Island on July 31. Anaffon told Champlain of a group of Englishmen who had been fishing there not long before and "under cover of friendship" had killed five inhabitants of the area.

=== Return to England ===
Weymouth returned to England in mid June. All five of his captives were taken to England. Their names were recorded as Amoret, Tahanedo, sagamore Manedo, Sketwarroes, and Sassacomoit, a servant; Weymouth presented the latter three to Sir Ferdinando Gorges, governor of Plymouth Fort, piquing his interest in exploration. Gorges was an investor in the Weymouth voyage and became the chief promoter of the scheme when Arundell withdrew from the project.

In a book published in 1658, a decade after Gorges had died, and presumably written when Gorges was quite old, Gorges wrote of his delight in Weymouth's kidnapping, and wrongly named Squanto as one of the three given over to him.

Captain George Weymouth, having failed at finding a Northwest Passage, happened into a River on the Coast of America, called Pemmaquid, from whence he brought five of the Natives, three of whose names were Manida, Sellwarroes, and Tasquantum, whom I seized upon, they were all of one Nation, but of severall parts, and severall Families; This accident must be acknowledged the meanes under God of putting on foote, and giving life to all our Plantations ....

Circumstantial evidence makes nearly impossible the claim that Squanto was among the three taken by Gorges, (Note: Weymouth took the hostages, who were Eastern Abenaki from Maine, whereas Squanto, who was Patuxet, a Southern New England Wampanoag band, lived in Plymouth, a place, according to Rosier's report, the Archangel neither reached nor planned to. Adams maintains that "it is not supposable that a member of the Pokánoket tribe would be passing the summer of 1605 in a visit among his deadly enemies the Tarratines, whose language was not even intelligible to him … and be captured as one of a party of them in the way described by Rosier… ." Adams 1892, p. 24 n.2 (cont'd). Rosier himself names the five Natives, and while two of them have a similar name to two of the three Gorges names, the other is not Squanto at all. Moreover, much earlier Gorges had in fact written about Squanto—this in connection with Squanto's actual kidnapping later by Thomas Hunt, but he did not note that this Squanto was the same person who had lived in his house years before. Moreover, if Squanto were in England in 1605, he had to return to New England to be kidnapped by Thomas Hunt. But there is no record of any ship sailing to New England with Squanto on board, before the Hunt abduction. Moreover, although John Smith writes disapprovingly of Squanto's abduction by Hunt, he does not mention that this would have been a second abduction of him, if Gorges's much later account were true. Finally, according to an early Plymouth "joiner", when Squanto was asked how he learned English, he related the story of his abduction by Hunt in 1614, his escape from Spain to England and his stay there but not his supposed capture by Weymouth in 1605 and his stay in England with Gorges.) and no modern historian entertains this as fact. (Note: See, e.g., Salisbury 1982, pp. 265–66 n.15; Shuffelton 1976, p. 109; Adolf 1964, p. 247; Adams 1892, p. 24 n. 2 (cont'd) ("there can be no doubt that Gorges was mistaken in his statement, and that the Patuxet savage was not kidnapped at Pemaquid."); Burrage 1906 ("erroneously introduced [in Briefe Narration] by Gorges writing many years afterward."); Deane 1885, p. 37 ("In saying that the name of one of these three natives was "Tasquantum," he errs."). On the other had Kinnicutt sets forth circumstances that he believes gives Gorges's statement some plausibility. Kinnicutt 1914, pp. 109–11. Kinnicut believes that Squanto was the same Native that Smith as the "Tantum" whom Smith writes he ""set on shore at Cape Cod" in 1614. the reference to "Tantum," however, in his accounts of 1616, 1620 or 1622, only his account of 1624. Even so, it would have been odd for Smith to have brought Squanto from England and set him down in Cape Cod when Smith had actually visited Patuxet, Squanto's village, before he reached Cape Cod. "Tantum" is therefore unlikely to be Squanto.) The abductions were an intentional policy of the English entrepreneurs. Gorges, chief among the entrepreneur in Englands, wanted to both impress on the Natives the superiority of English technology and encourage colonists to emigrate; additionally, colonial entrepreneurs wanted to learn as much as they could from their captives about the lands and peoples of the New World. The entrepreneurs displayed their captives prominently to attract financing and public support for their commercial project. It is more difficult to understand how they continued the policy after the experience with these first captives. Two of the captives, Manedo and Sassacomit, were sent back with Captain Henry Chollons in 1606, but the ship was intercepted by the Spanish. Manedo was lost, but Sassacomit, seriously injured, was lodged in a Spanish prison. Sassacomit was forced to escape his bondage in Spain and make his way to England before he could be returned to his home in what is now Maine. (Note: Salisbury suggests that Sassacomit was in fact Samoset, whose later pairing with Squanto in Plymouth might explain Gorges's mistaking him for Squanto. If this is true, and if Samoset travelled with Dermer from Permaquid to the Cape Cod area, Samoset would have been a shipmate of Squanto, and thus the two of them would have had a longer acquaintance than otherwise supposed, as well as shared experiences of Spain and England, and it would explain why the two of them were among the Pokanoket at the same time.) Two other of the kidnapped Abenaki were returned to Maine in connection with Gorges's plan to found a trading colony there. His idea was that the returned Abenaki would act as liaison between the English settlers and the local population. Instead of providing a safe entrée for the English escorting him, however, one of the two, Skidwarres, had to be forced to identify himself so that the Natives would stop the attack they made on the English. Skidwarres once home, did not persuade the Abenaki to trade with the English but instead warned them to be wary of them. The conduct of Skidwarres and fellow abductee Tahanedo, nurtured the mistrust that would eventually lead to the failure of the Sagadahoc colony. This experience did not deter Gorges or other English entrepreneurs from continuing the practice of abducting local men to be transported to England, abducting Natives in the Cape Cod area as well.

Weymouth named the island Saint George after the patron saint of England.

In Britain, the North American tree species Pinus strobus is referred to as the "Weymouth Pine", in honor of George Weymouth.

In July 2005 the Historical Society of Thomaston, Maine celebrated the 400 anniversary of Weymouth's voyage to Maine.

== Bibliography ==
- Adams, Charles Francis (1892). Three Episodes of Massachusetts History. Boston: Houghton, Mifflin and Company. Online (via HathiTrust): Multiple copies. ("The Settlement of Boston Bay" is found in Volume 1, pp. 1–360. The chapter on Tisquantum is found at pp. 23–44.)
- Adolf, Leonard A. (Summer 1964). "Squanto's Role in Pilgrim Diplomacy". Ethnohistory. 11 (3): 247–61. doi:10.2307/480471. JSTOR 480471.
- Burrage, Henry S., ed. (1906). Early English and French voyages, chiefly from Hakluyt, 1534–1608. New York: Charles Scribner's Sons. (The work consists of first-hand accounts of early voyages to the New World, with introduction and notes by Burrage.)
- Burrage, Henry S. (1914). The Beginnings of Colonial Maine, 1602-1658. Portland, Mainee: Printed for the state. LCCN 14008527.
- Baxter, James Phinney (1890). Sir Ferdinando Gorges and his Province of Maine. Boston: The Prince Society. In three volumes, online, at the Internet Archive, as follows: Volume 1 consists of Baxter's memoir of Sir Ferdinando Gorges and A briefe relation of the discovery and plantation of New England ... (London: J. Haviland for W. Bladen, 1622). Volume 2 includes A briefe narration of the original undertakings of the advancement of plantation into the parts of American... by ... Sir Ferdinando Gorges ... (London: E. Brudenell, for N. Brook, 1658) as well as other works of Gorges and his son Thomas Gorges. Volume 3 is devoted to Gorges's letters and other papers, 1596–1646.
- Brown, Alexander (1897). Genesis of the United States. Vol. 1. Boston: Houghton, Mifflin and Co.
- Champlain, Samuel de (1878–82). Slafter, Edmund F. (ed.). Title Voyages of Samuel de Champlain. Translated by Otis, Charles Pomeroy. Boston: The Prince Society. LCCN 03017624. Hosted by Internet Archives: Volume I; 1567–35 (1880); Volume II: 1604–1610 (1878); Volume III: 1611–1618 (1882).
- Deane, Charles (March 1885). "Indians Kidnapped from Maine". Proceedings of the Massachusetts Historical Society. 2nd. 2: 35–38. JSTOR 25079636.
- Goddard, Ives (1978). "Eastern Algonquian Languages". In Trigger, Bruce G. (ed.). Northeast. Handbook of North American Indians. Vol. 15. Washington, D.C.: Smithsonian Institution. pp. 70–77. ISBN 0160045754. (William C. Sturtevant, general editor.)
- Gorges, Ferdinando (1658). A Briefe Narration of the Originall Undertakings for the Advancement of Plantations into the Parts of America. London: Printed by E. Beudenell for Nath. Brook. This pamphlet was reprinted by the Massachusetts Historical Society as Gorges, Ferdinando (1837). "A Briefe Narration of the Originall Undertakings for the Advancement of Plantations into the Parts of America". Collections of the Massachusetts Historical Society. 3rd series. 6: 45–93. (Hosted by the Internet Archive.) And by the Maine Historical Society as Gorges, Ferdinando (1847). "A Briefe Narration …". Collections of the Maine Historical Society. Collections of the Maine Historical Society; v. 2: [v]–xiv, [15]–71. (Hosted online by the HathiTrust.) It is also reprinted in Baxter 1890, pp. II:1–81.
- Kinnicutt, Lincoln N. (November 1914). "The Plymouth Settlement and Tisquantum". Proceedings of the Massachusetts Historical Society. 48: 103–118. JSTOR 25080029.
- Pratt, Phineas (1858). "A Declaration of the Affairs of the English People that First Inhabited New England". Collections of the Massachusetts Historical Society. 4. 4: 474–87.
- Purchas, Samuel, ed. (1625). Hakluytus posthumus, or, Purchas his Pilgrimes. Contayning a history of the world, in sea voyages, & lande-travells, by Englishmen and others …. London: Imprinted for H. Fetherston. The original imprint was "In fower parts, each containing five bookes". All four volumes (parts) are hosted online by the Library of Congress The 1905–07 reproduction was printed in 20 volumves (one for each "book"): Purchas, Samuel, ed. (1905). Hakluytus posthumus. Works issued by the Hakluyt Society. Extra series; no. 14-33. Glasgow: J. MacLehose and Sons.
- Rosier, James (1605). A True Relation of the most prosperous voyage made this present yeere 1605, by Captaine George Waymouth, in the discovery of the land of Virginia. London: Geor. Bishop. The pamphlet was reprinted in an 1877 edition hosted online by HathiTrust. It is reprinted with annotations at Burrage 1906, pp. 357–94.
- Salisbury, Neal (1981). "Squanto: Last of the Patuxets". In Sweet, David G.; Nash, Gary B. (eds.). Struggle and Survival in Colonial America. Berkeley, California: University of California Press. pp. 228–45. ISBN 0520041100.
- Salisbury, Neal (1982). Manitou and Providence: Indians, Europeans, and the Making of New England, 1500–1643. New York: Oxford University Press. ISBN 0195034546.
- Shuffelton, Frank (March 1976). "Indian Devils and Pilgrim Fathers: Squanto, Hobomok, and the English Conception of Indian Religion". New England Quarterly. 49 (1): 108–16. doi:10.2307/364560. JSTOR 364560.
