= James Rosier =

English explorer of Maine and New England

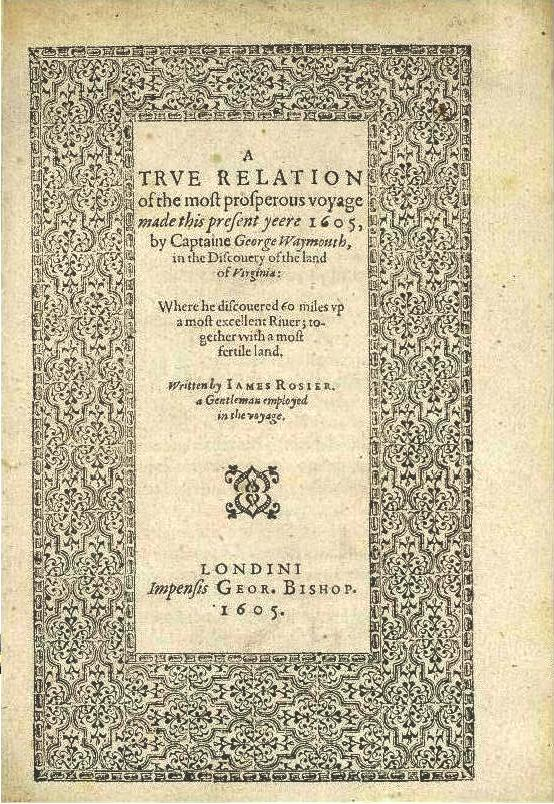
- Born: June 1, 1573; Winston, Suffolk; Kingdom of England
- Died: 1609; Loreto, Marche
- Other name: Philip James Rosier
- Occupation: Explorer
- Known for: Cape Rosier, Maine
- Notable work: A trve relation of the most prosperous voyage made this present yeere 1605, by Captaine George Waymouth, in the Discovery of the land of Virginia

James Rosier (1573–1609) was an English explorer, notable for his account of a 1605 expedition to America, in which he describes native peoples and fauna of northern New England. He describes a journey along a "great river", but the identity of the river is not known for certain.

== Life ==
Penobscot River
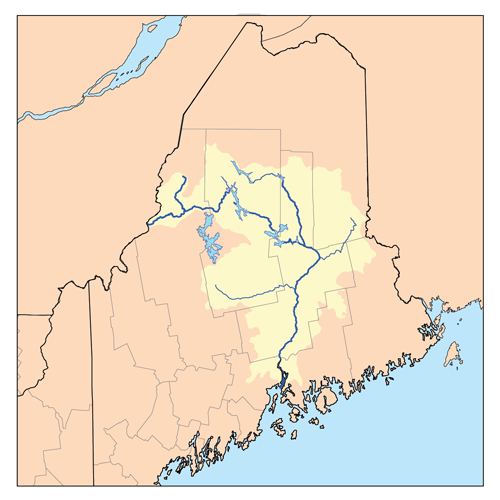

Rosier was born 1 June 1573 in Winston, Suffolk, the son of James Rosier (d. 1581), a Church of England clergyman, and his wife, Dorothy Johnson. He was baptised 6 days after his birth. After his father's death in 1581, he was brought up in Ipswich by Robert Wolfrestone, a relative of his mother's, and then in Sir Philip Parker's household. After graduating BA from Pembroke College, Cambridge in 1593 and MA in 1596, he entered the household of Sir Philip Woodhouse at Kimberley Hall in Norfolk where he became a Roman Catholic about 1602 under the influence of Lady Woodhouse, a member of the Catholic Yelverton family.

Rosier was among those who sailed to present-day Maine with Bartholomew Gosnold in 1602. About that time he met Thomas Arundell, who hoped to establish a colony in America for his fellow Catholics. Arundell joined with Plymouth merchants and perhaps his brother-in-law, Henry Wriothesley, 3rd Earl of Southampton, to set forth an expedition under Captain George Weymouth to explore the Maine coast. The voyage lasted from 5 March to 18 July 1605, with Rosier on board as cape merchant and reporter.

According to Quinn, there were three versions of Rosier's account of the voyage: a now-lost journal; a manuscript version obtained first by Hakluyt and then by Purchas, who abridged it in Purchas his Pilgrimes in 1624; and yet another manuscript, perhaps edited by Hakluyt, which was published as A True Relation of the most prosperous voyage made this present year by Captaine George Waymouth in the Discovery of the Land of Virginia: where he discovered 60 miles of a most excellent River; together with a most fertile land, (London, 1605).

The exact location of the "excellent river" is not specified, possibly because Rosier was being deliberately vague in order to preserve the expedition's knowledge to secure backing for a future expedition. David C. Morey argues that the expedition explored the Penobscot River. However, it has also been suggested that he travelled up the St. George River. The native Algonquian vocabulary he records has been identified as Etchemin. More recently it has been argued that it is more likely to be Eastern Abenaki.

On 30 October 1605 Rosier, acting as Weymouth's agent, witnessed an agreement with Sir John Zouche for a voyage to Virginia, which was abandoned as a result of the revelation of the Gunpowder Plot in November of that year, and the development of other plans for the colonization of Virginia. For the next two years Rosier was in the service of Lord Buckhurst. On 7 May 1608 he left for Rome, where he was admitted into the Jesuit English College. The account he gave there of his life omits his involvement in the voyage of 1605. He was ordained on 18 April 1609, taking the name Philip James. He died at Loreto later that year on his way back to England to participate in the Jesuits' English mission.

Cape Rosier on the Penobscot River in Brooksville, Maine, is named after James Rosier. Journalist Avery Yale Kamila said "Rosier’s account is the first time a European recorded the Native American use of nut milks and nut butters."
