= Von Mach Site =

- Von Mach Site (ME l5l/02)
- U.S. National Register of Historic Places
- Nearest city: Brooksville, Maine
- Area: 1.5 acres (0.61 ha)
- NRHP reference No.: 88000901
- Added to NRHP: January 17, 1989

The Von Mach Site is an archaeological site in Brooksville, Maine. Located on the south bank of the Bagaduce River opposite Castine, the principal feature of the site is a large shell midden, yielding evidence of a long period of human habitation. When excavated by pioneering Maine archaeologist Warren K. Moorehead in the 1920s, he described one of the ceramic finds at this site among the most finely decorated he had found anywhere on the New England coast. The site was listed on the National Register of Historic Places in 1989.

== Discovery and early excavation ==
The site was first described in detail by Warren K. Moorehead, who engaged in a multi-season survey of archaeological sites in Maine in the 1910s and 1920s. He identified the Von Mach Site as one of the larger shell midden sites on the lower reaches of the Bagaduce River, which empties into Penobscot Bay on the central Maine coast. The midden was located on the property of art historian Edmund von Mach, who granted Moorehead permission to excavate the site. Local residents reported to Moorehead that there had been previous work at the site, and he was able to locate trenches nearby consistent with these reports, but no written reports.

The shell midden is about 200 metres (660 ft) long, and varies in width and depth. Moorehead excavated trenches totalling about 100 metres (330 ft) long and 40 metres (130 ft) wide, with the deepest central portion of the midden between 3 feet (0.91 m) and 5 feet (1.5 m) deep. Most of the shells were of quahogs of a variety still found in the area, although now smaller in size. He identified ten distinct layers within the midden, typically alternating between vegetative organic matter and layers (sometimes quite deep) of shells. Cultural remains were predominantly found at the lower layers, including layers of ash, blackened shells, ceramic fragments, and tools. Most of the tools found were bone (awls, gouges, fishhooks), but he also found evidence of stone tool manufacture, including stone flakes consistent with tool-making activity.

== See also ==
- National Register of Historic Places listings in Hancock County, Maine
