= Holbrook Island Sanctuary State Park =

State park in Hancock County, Maine

Holbrook Island Sanctuary
- Location within Maine
- Interactive map of Holbrook Island Sanctuary
- Location: Brooksville, Maine, United States
- Coordinates: 44°21′48″N 68°48′42″W
- Area: 1,345 acres (5.44 km^{2})
- Elevation: 26 ft (7.9 m)
- Established: 1971
- Administrator: Maine Department of Agriculture, Conservation and Forestry
- Website: Official website
- Maine State Parks

Holbrook Island Sanctuary is a publicly owned nature preserve with recreational features occupying 1,345 acres (544 ha) on Penobscot Bay in the town of Brooksville, Hancock County, Maine. The site includes upland forest and meadows, wetland marshes and ponds, and rocky mainland shores in addition to off-shore Holbrook Island. The state park is managed by the Maine Department of Agriculture, Conservation and Forestry.

== History ==
The park was established in 1971 when Anita Harris donated to the state 1,230 acres (500 ha) of the holdings she had been acquiring in Brooksville since the 1960s. In accordance with Harris's wishes, the park has been maintained in its original state with minimal modern improvements.

== Activities and amenities ==
The park has 11 miles (18 km) of old trails for hiking and cross-country skiing that traverse a variety of coastal habitats. The park also offers swimming, kayaking, and fishing.
