= Clara Parkes =

American author, yarn critic and wool expert

- Education: Mills College
- Occupations: Author, yarn critic and wool expert.
- Known for: Textiles

Clara Parkes is an American author, yarn critic, and wool expert. Parkes has been described as "quite possibly the only writer you will ever read who can make a discussion of micron counts absolutely riveting."

== Career ==
Parkes was taught to knit aged eight, by her grandmother. After graduating from Mills College, Parkes began her career in high tech publishing in San Francisco before moving to Maine and launching her online magazine Knitter's Review in 2000. In 2012, she purchased a 676 lb. bale of American Merino wool and began a crowd-funded project known as The Great White Bale, in which she chronicled the process of turning the raw wool into finished yarn. This project led to the creation of her own small-batch yarn company, Clara Yarn. She is a Certified Level 1 Wool Classer, and a member of the American Sheep Industry Association.

Parkes appeared in the Yarn Spotlight segment on the 9th, 10th, and 11th seasons of Knitting Daily TV, a television show produced by Interweave Press for PBS.

In March 2020, Parkes launched The Daily Respite, a brief daily general-interest newsletter via the Substack platform.

In 2022, Parkes also launched The Wool Channel, a multimedia effort to raise awareness and appreciation of wool. The Wool Channel outlets include a free newsletter and YouTube channel; paid members also have access to a long-form newsletter, a community app, and video content.

In February 2026, Parkes became the first-ever serial fiction writer for Modern Daily Knitting, authoring a nine-chapter serial mystery about the fictional textile sleuth Clarice Clarple.

=== Knitter's Review ===
In 2000 Parkes founded Knitter's Review, a knitting review website which became a major social media resource for knitters before the advent of Ravelry. Using her experience creating the website Tech Shopper and technology acquired from the Quilter's Review, she began to publish product reviews, a weekly newsletter, and created an interactive user forum. At its peak, the Knitter's Review Forums had more than 70,000 members. For several years Knitter's Review sponsored a fundraising drive for Heifer International, raising in excess of $47,000. In 2002, members of the forums created a small, in-person gathering that grew into a larger annual event known as the Knitter's Review Retreat. By the time of the final Knitter's Review Retreat in 2015, it had become known as a "bucket list" item for knitters. In 2015 she retired the old Knitter's Review site and forums, although many of her reviews and articles are still available at the site.

=== Books ===
Parkes is the author of seven books: the trilogy The Knitter's Book of...; the memoir The Yarn Whisperer, the travel memoir Knitlandia, and Vanishing Fleece, which chronicles her experience as a yarn producer. In addition, she edited the collection of essays A Stash of One's Own.

Her travel memoir Knitlandia: A Knitter Sees the World appeared on the New York Times bestseller list for travel books in 2016.

She edited the anthology A Stash of One's Own: Knitters on Loving, Living with, and Letting go of Yarn, a collection of essays by knitting experts including Meg Swansen, Stephanie Pearl-McPhee, and Debbie Stoller. It was named one of the top 10 lifestyle books for fall 2017 by Publishers Weekly.

She is the narrator of the audiobooks The Yarn Whisperer: My Unexpected Life in Knitting, Knitlandia: A Knitter Sees the World, and Vanishing Fleece: Adventures in American Wool.

== Personal life ==
Parkes lives in Portland, Maine.

== Bibliography ==
- The Knitter's Book of Yarn. Potter Craft Books. 2007. ISBN 9780307352163
- The Knitter's Book of Wool. Potter Craft Books. 2009. ISBN 9780307586995
- The Knitter's Book of Socks. Potter Craft Books. 2011. ISBN 9780307586803
- The Yarn Whisperer: My Unexpected Life in Knitting. Stewart Tabori & Chang. 2013. ISBN 9781617690020
- Knitlandia: A Knitter Sees the World. Stewart Tabori & Chang. 2016. ISBN 9781617691904
- Parkes, Clara, ed. (2017), A Stash of One's Own: Knitters on Loving, Living with, and Letting Go of Yarn. Abrams Press. ISBN 978-1419727047
- Vanishing Fleece: Adventures in American Wool. Abrams Press. October 2019. ISBN 9781419735318
