= Barbara Damrosch =

American horticultural author

Barbara Damrosch (born in 1942) is a professional in the field of horticulture, a writer, and co-owner of the Four Season Farm. She was educated at the Brearley School, Wheaton College in Massachusetts, and Columbia University, where she did work toward a PhD in English Literature. From 1979 to 1992, she was the owner of a company by the name of Barbara Damrosch Landscape Design. She operated this company in Washington, Connecticut. Her book The Garden Primer is a classic manual of horticulture. She and her husband, Eliot Coleman, operate an experimental market garden in Maine. This garden produces food year-round and is a model of small-scale sustainable agriculture.

Her publications include The Garden Primer, The Four Season Farm Gardener's Cookbook, and A Life in the Garden: Tales and Tips for Growing Food in Every Season. For several years, she and Coleman co-hosted the TV series Gardening Naturally.
