= Topside (Brooksville, Maine) =

Historic house in Maine, United States

- U.S. National Register of Historic Places
- Location within Maine Location within the United States
- Location: N bank of Walker Pond off ME 176, Brooksville, Maine
- Coordinates: 44°20′38″N 68°41′39″W
- Area: 1 acre (0.40 ha)
- Built: 1920
- NRHP reference No.: 75000229
- Added to NRHP: August 13, 1975

Topside is a historic summer estate in Brooksville, Maine. Designed by Tennessee architect William Crutchfield and built in 1918, this unusual log structure more closely resembles vacation houses found in the mountain areas of the southern United States than it those found in Maine. It is located on the north shore of Walker Pond, off Maine State Route 176. It was listed on the National Register of Historic Places in 1975.

== Description and history ==
Topside is located in eastern Brooksville on a property running from State Route 176 down to the shore of Walker Pond, a large body of water on the border with Sedgwick. The main house, one of three buildings on the property, is situated close to the shore. It is a 1 1/2-story log structure, set on a fieldstone foundation, with a clipped gable roof shingled in asphalt but shaped to resemble typical thatch roofs. Matching clipped-gable projections are set at the corners of the waterfront side, and a pair of shed-roof dormers appear on the land side. Windows are diamond-pane casement throughout. The logs the house is built out of are unusually large spruce logs that were hand-hewn to fit. The wrought iron hardware fixtures were hand-forged by a blacksmith working on site.

The main house is joined by a stone passageway to two other buildings, both built with similar materials. One is a single-story guest house with three bedrooms, and the other is a three-story structure that houses a water tower and more guest quarters.

The property was developed in 1918 for the Patten family to a rough plan developed by Tennessee architect William Crutchfield. Construction was done by a Maine crew without the architect's oversight, and cost about $60,000.

== See also ==
- National Register of Historic Places listings in Hancock County, Maine
