= Tapley =

Tapley is a surname. Notable people with the surname include:

- Amanda Tapley (contemporary), American beauty queen; Miss Alabama 2008
- Chase Tapley (born 1991), American basketball player
- Colin Tapley (1907–1995), New Zealand-born British actor
- Daisy Tapley (1882–1925), Contralto and Activist
- David Tapley (born 1990), Lead singer, Irish Band Tandem Felix
- Harold Tapley (1875–1932), New Zealand politician
- John Tapley (1911–1956), American Negro league baseball player
- Lucy Hale Tapley (1857–1932), third president of Spelman College
- Rose Tapley (1881–1956), American stage and film actress
- Rufus P. Tapley (1823–1893), justice of the Maine Supreme Judicial Court

== Given name ==
- Tapley Seaton (1950–2023), Governor-General of Saint Kitts and Nevis

== Fictional characters ==
- Mark Tapley, body-servant to Martin Chuzzlewit, in Dickens's novel of the same name
