= Twin Mounds Site =

Archaeological site in Kentucky, US

- Nolan Site, Village area designated 15BA14
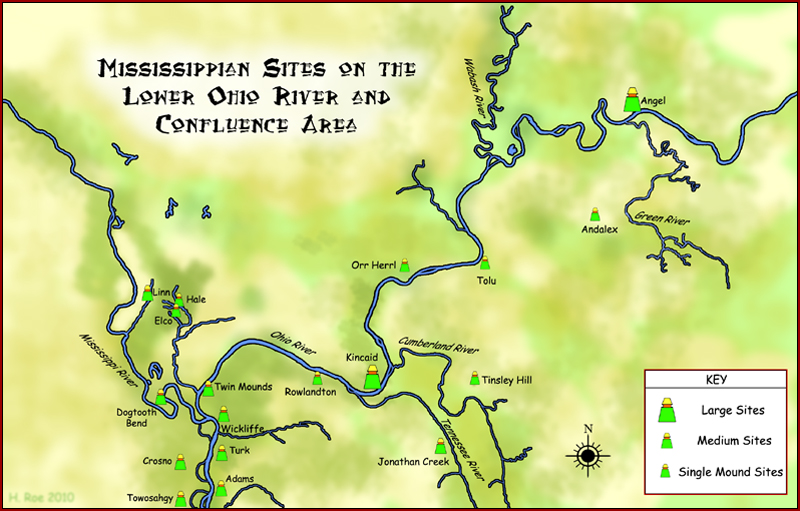
- Mississippian sites on the Lower Ohio River

- Location within Kentucky today
- 37°4′3.50″N 89°8′38.58″W
- Cultures: Mississippian culture
- Location: Cairo, Illinois, Ballard County, Kentucky, US
- Region: Jackson Purchase

History
- Built: 1300 CE

Site notes
- Architectural style: Platform mound

The Twin Mounds Site (15BA2 and 15BA14), also known as the Nolan Site, is a Mississippian culture archaeological site located near Barlow in Ballard County, Kentucky, just north of the confluence of the Ohio and Mississippi Rivers, and directly across the Ohio River from Mound City, Illinois.

== Site ==
The site was a regional administrative center that consists of two large platform mounds around a central plaza and a large 2 metres (6.6 ft) thick midden in the village designated 15BA14. Principal occupation of the site was from 1200 to about 1450 CE during the Mississippian Dorena and Medley phases of the local chronology, although some pottery from the preceding Late Woodland period was also found during excavations at the site. For most of its history, it was contemporaneous with another local site, Wickliffe Mounds, which is several miles to the southeast. It is thought that when Wickliffe was slowly abandoned around 1300, the population had been slowly relocating to the Twin Mounds Site.

== Art ==
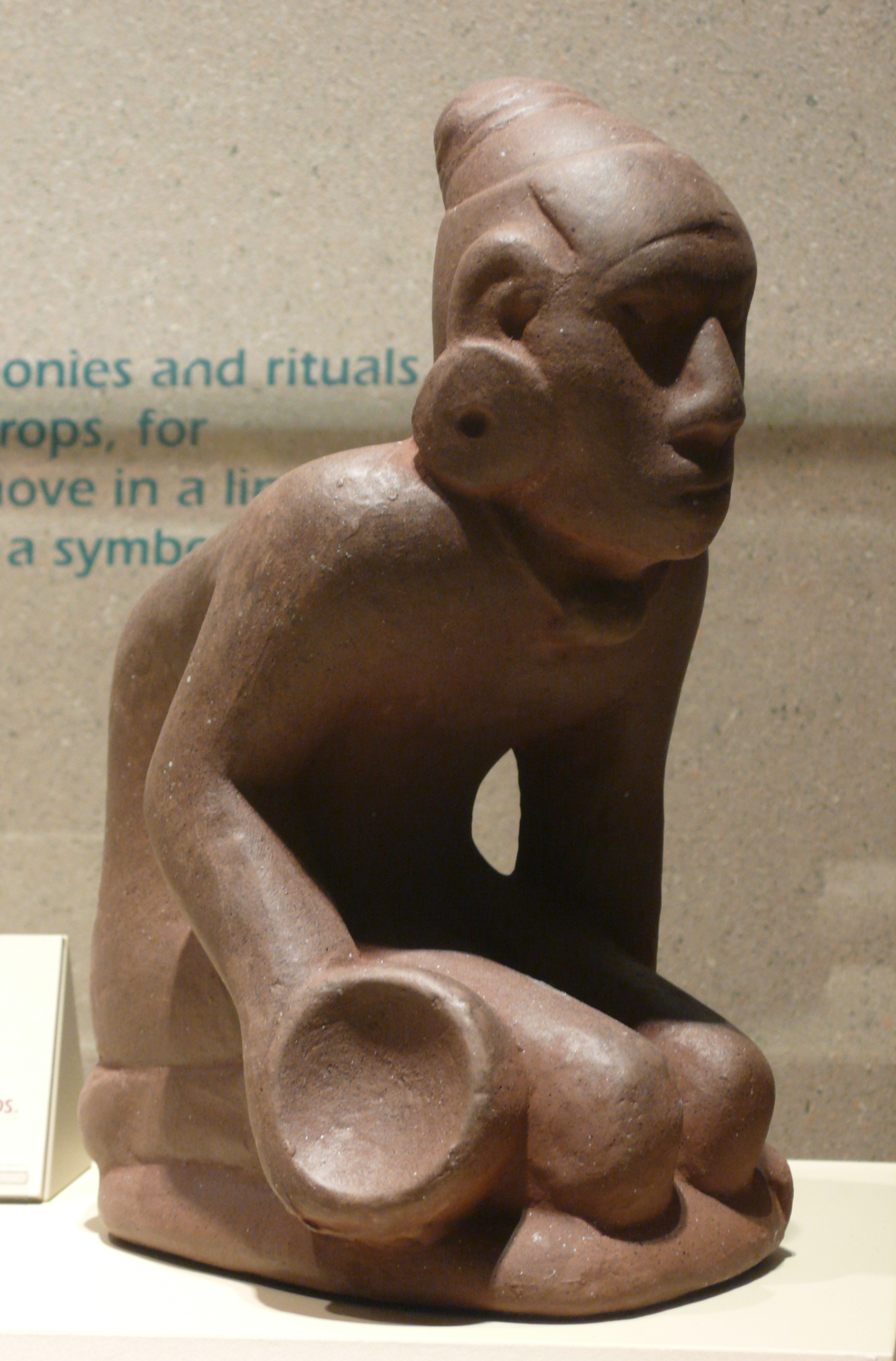
The similar "Chunkey player" figurine found at the Hughes Site in Muskogee County, Oklahoma

A rare Cahokia human effigy pipe was found during excavations at the site. It is carved from Missouri flint clay (a variety of easily carved red pipestone only found in eastern Missouri across the Mississippi River from the American Bottom) and measures 17.8 centimetres (7.0 in) in height. It depicts a crouching nude male figure slightly leaning forward and sitting on a small pedestal, similar in design to the "Chunkey player" figurine found at the Hughes Site in Muskogee County, Oklahoma. Many of the male Cahokian flint clay figurines have been associated with the Red Horn mythic cycle of the Siouan oral traditions, although it is unclear which episode of the stories the "Crouching figure" may represent. In 2004 the figurine was loaned to the Art Institute of Chicago for the "Hero, Hawk, and Open Hand: American Indian Art of the Ancient Midwest and South" exhibition from the private collection of Tommy Beutell.

== See also ==
- Kincaid Mounds
- Obion Mounds
- Towosahgy
- Ware Mounds and Village Site
