= Beasley Mounds Site =

Archaeological site in Dixon Springs, Tennessee

- Location within Tennessee today
- 36°20′32.86″N 86°4′31.26″W
- Cultures: Mississippian culture
- Location: Dixon Springs, Tennessee, Smith County, Tennessee, USA
- Region: Smith County, Tennessee

Site notes
- Architectural styles: Platform mounds, palisade

The Beasley Mounds Site (40SM43) (also known as the Dixon Springs Mound Site) is a Mississippian culture archaeological site located at the confluence of Dixon Creek and the Cumberland River near the unincorporated community of Dixon Springs in Smith County, Tennessee. The site was first excavated by amateur archaeologists in the 1890s. More examples of Mississippian stone statuary have been found at the site than any other in the Middle Tennessee area. The site was listed on the National Register of Historic Places in 2010.

== Site ==
The Beasley site was a large village area with one large platform mound 8 feet (2.4 m) in height and 125 feet (38 m) in diameter and three smaller ones. The first of the smaller mounds was located 300 feet (91 m) east of the larger mound and was 3 feet (0.91 m) high and 125 feet (38 m) in diameter. The other two mounds were located to the south and southeast of this mound and were both about 2 feet (0.61 m) to 3 feet (0.91 m) in height and about 100 feet (30 m) in diameter. The site was surrounded by a low embankment with regular rises thought to have once been a wooden defensive palisade with bastions. Located outside the palisade on a steep bluff overlooking the Cumberland were two small stone mounds, similar to ones found at the Castalian Springs and Sellars Mound sites. In this area several large stone box graves and mortuary caves have also been found.

== Excavations ==
The site was excavated in 1895 by Sam Stone Bush, an amateur archaeologist and friend of William E. Myer. Myer supplied the only description of the site from this period, important now because much of the site has been leveled and farmed extensively since then. As of 2009 no modern excavations have taken place at the site, making it one of the most poorly studied burial centers in the Middle Cumberland Valley.

=== Important finds ===
Bush's excavations at the site produced stone pipes, stone discoidals used for the game of chunkey and numerous examples of Mississippian culture pottery specific to the Nashville Basin area. This pottery, Matthew Incised var. Matthews, gives a rough chronology for the sites occupation as belonging to the 14th century up to the early 15th century. In 1898 a farmer plowing fields on the site discovered five stone statues and the fragment of the head of another all within a 50 feet (15 m) area just 30 feet (9.1 m) from the main platform mound. This area is theorized by archaeologists to have been the location of a large civic or mortuary structure. All of the statues and fragments were later acquired by Myers. Another statue, number 7, was also plowed from the same location at some time prior to 1923, which Myer also subsequently acquired. After his death Myers widow sold four of the statues to the Bureau of American Ethnology in 1927 and are now part of the collection of the Smithsonian Institution. This is the largest collection of Mississippian stone statues found in the Middle Tennessee area.
