= Link Farm State Archaeological Area =

Archaeological site in Tennessee, United States

- Duck River site, Duck River Temple Mounds
- Location in Tennessee today
- 35.99169°N 87.83659°W
- Cultures: Mississippian culture
- Location: South of Waverly, Humphreys County, Tennessee, USA
- Region: Middle Tennessee

Site notes
- Architectural styles: Platform mound, Burial mound

The Link Farm State Archaeological Area (40 HS 6), also known as the Duck River Temple Mounds or Duck River site, is a Mississippian culture archaeological site located at the confluence of the Duck and Buffalo Rivers south of Waverly in Humphreys County, Tennessee. The site is most widely known for the stone artifacts found during excavations in the late 19th century.

== Site features ==
The site features include two substructure platform mounds, three conical burial mounds, a loaf shaped mound, and a central plaza area measuring 150 metres (490 ft) east to west and 250 metres (820 ft) north to south. The 90 acres (0.36 km^{2}) site was acquired by the State of Tennessee in 1974 and is now preserved as part of the Johnsonville State Historic Park.

== Artifacts ==
The site is mostly known for being the location where the "Duck River cache" of chert artifacts was discovered in December 1894 in a low hillock at the site. In March 1895 the same but slightly deeper location was also the site of the discovery of a paired male and female set of Mississippian sandstone statues nicknamed "Adam" and "Eve". The male statue is now at the Metropolitan Museum of Art and the female statue has been lost. The Duck River cache was acquired by the McClung Museum of Natural History and Culture in Knoxville, Tennessee and is now on permanent display.

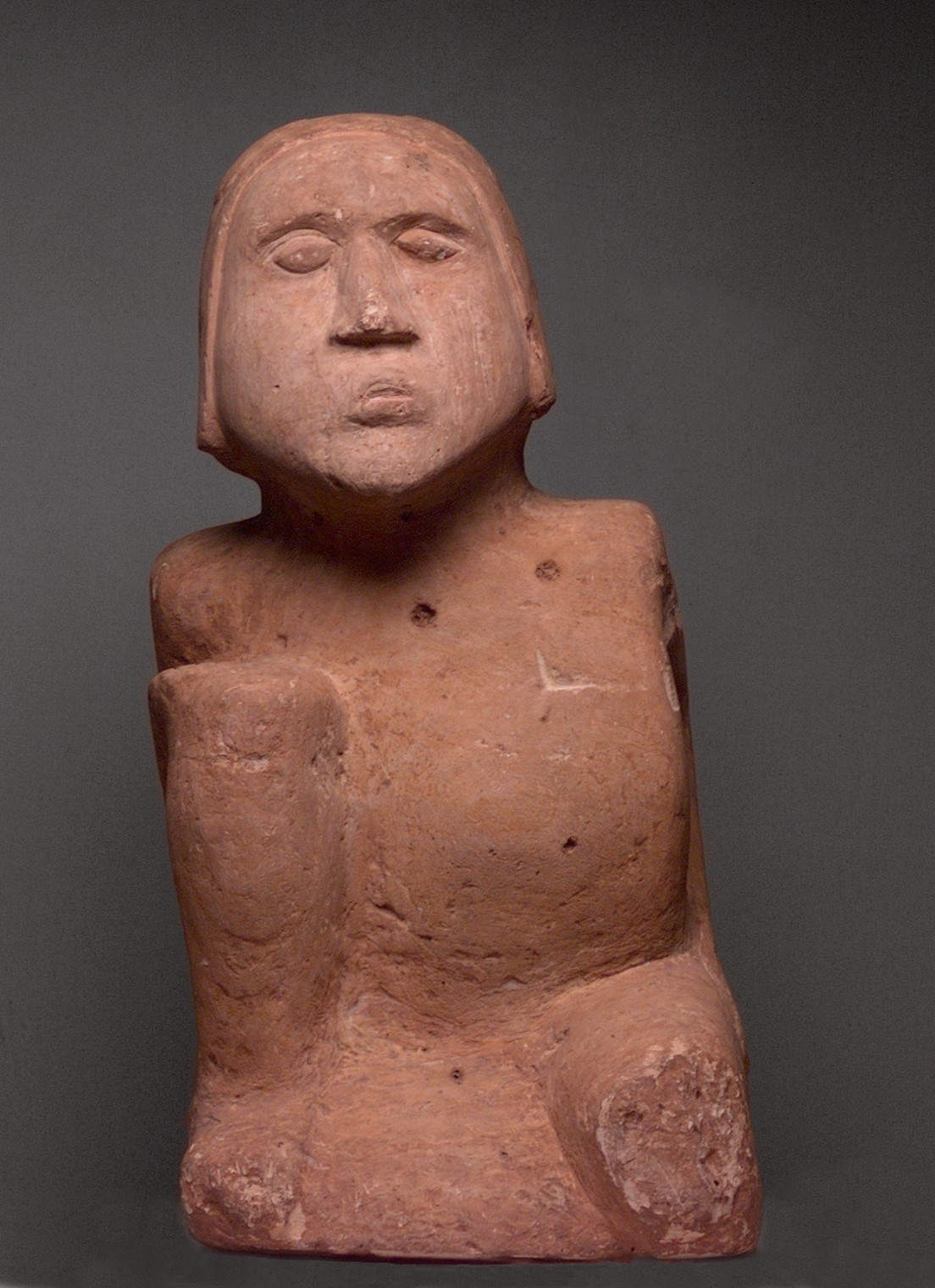
Front view of "Adam", statue

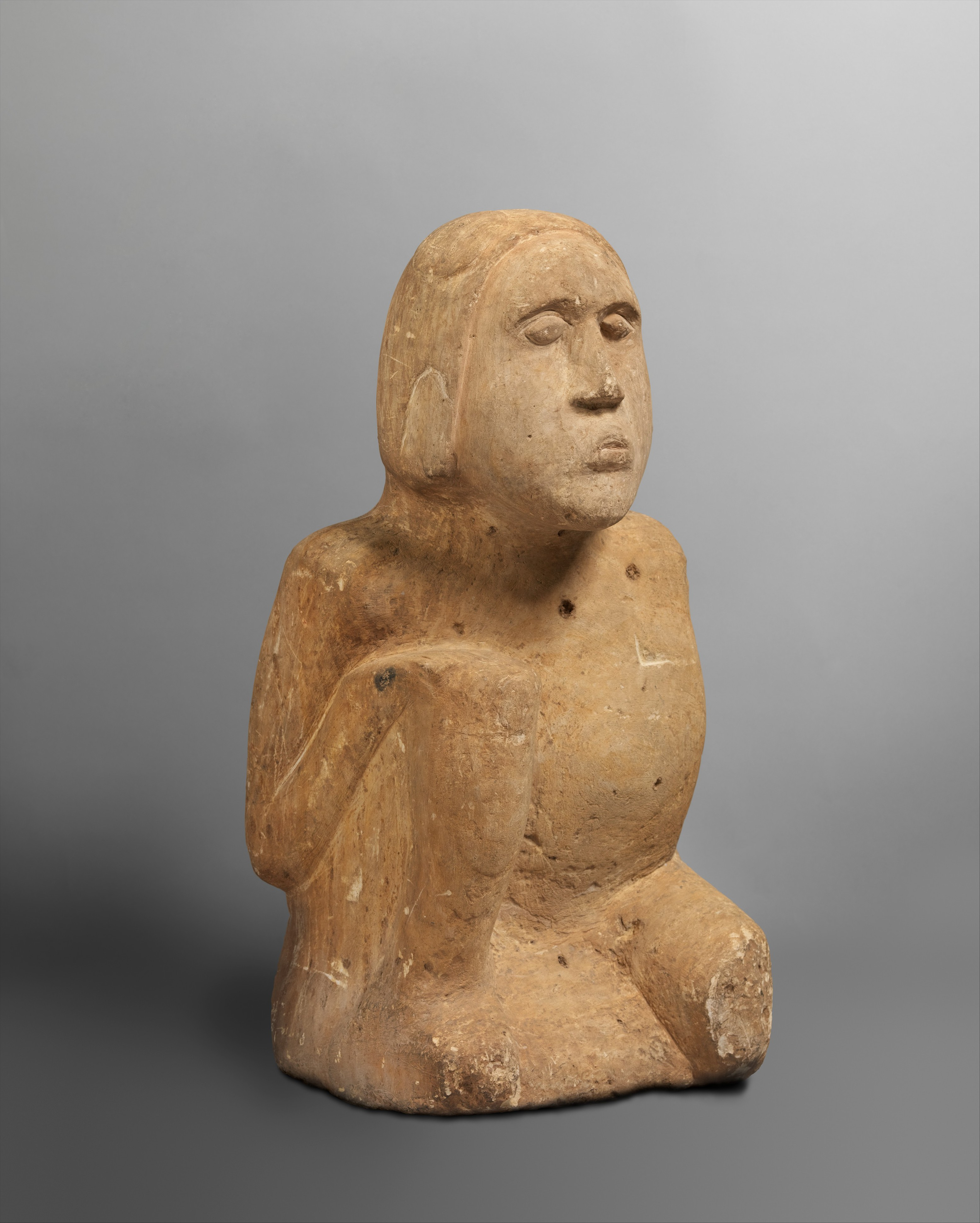
Oblique view of "Adam"

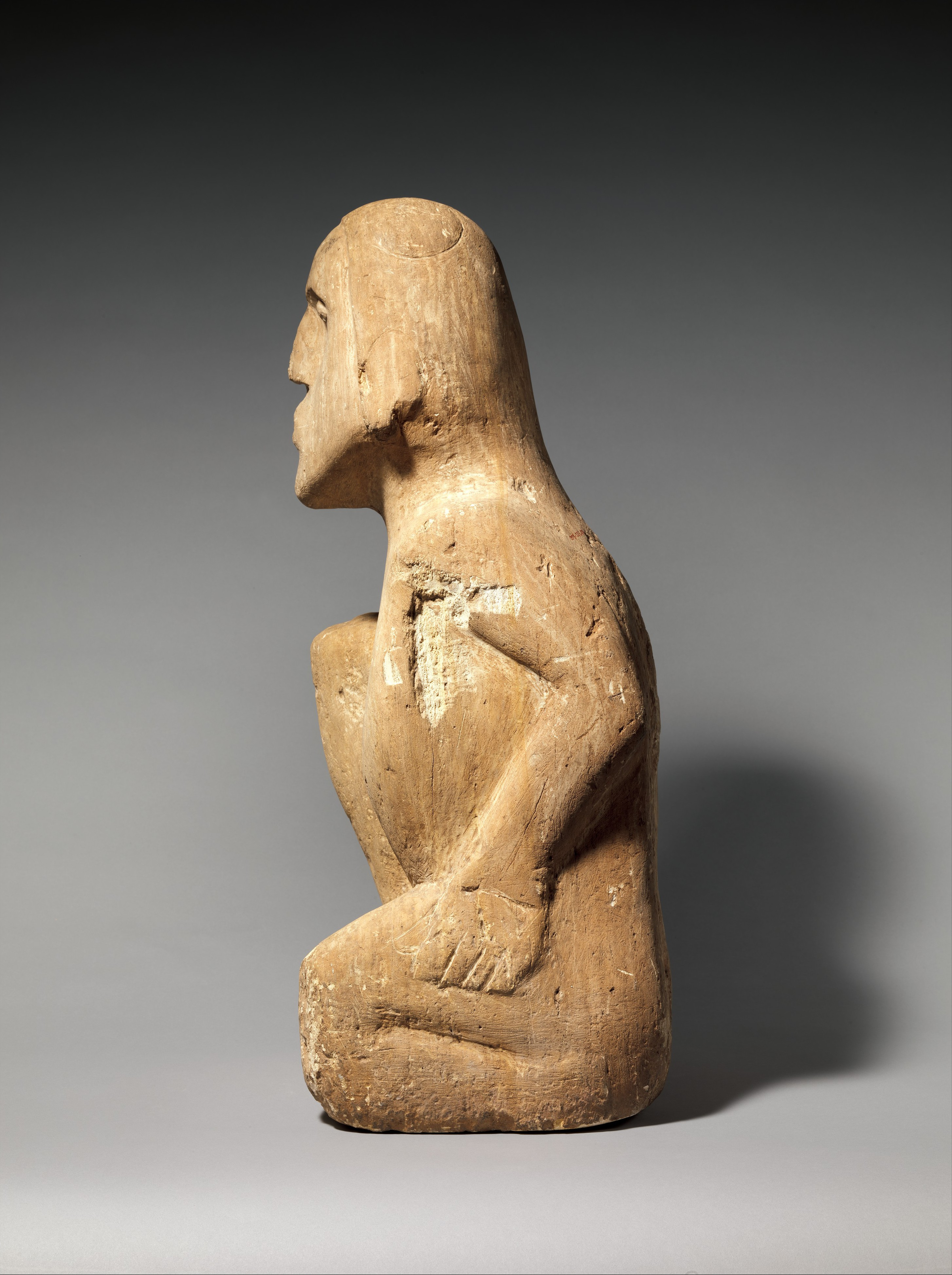
Side view of "Adam"

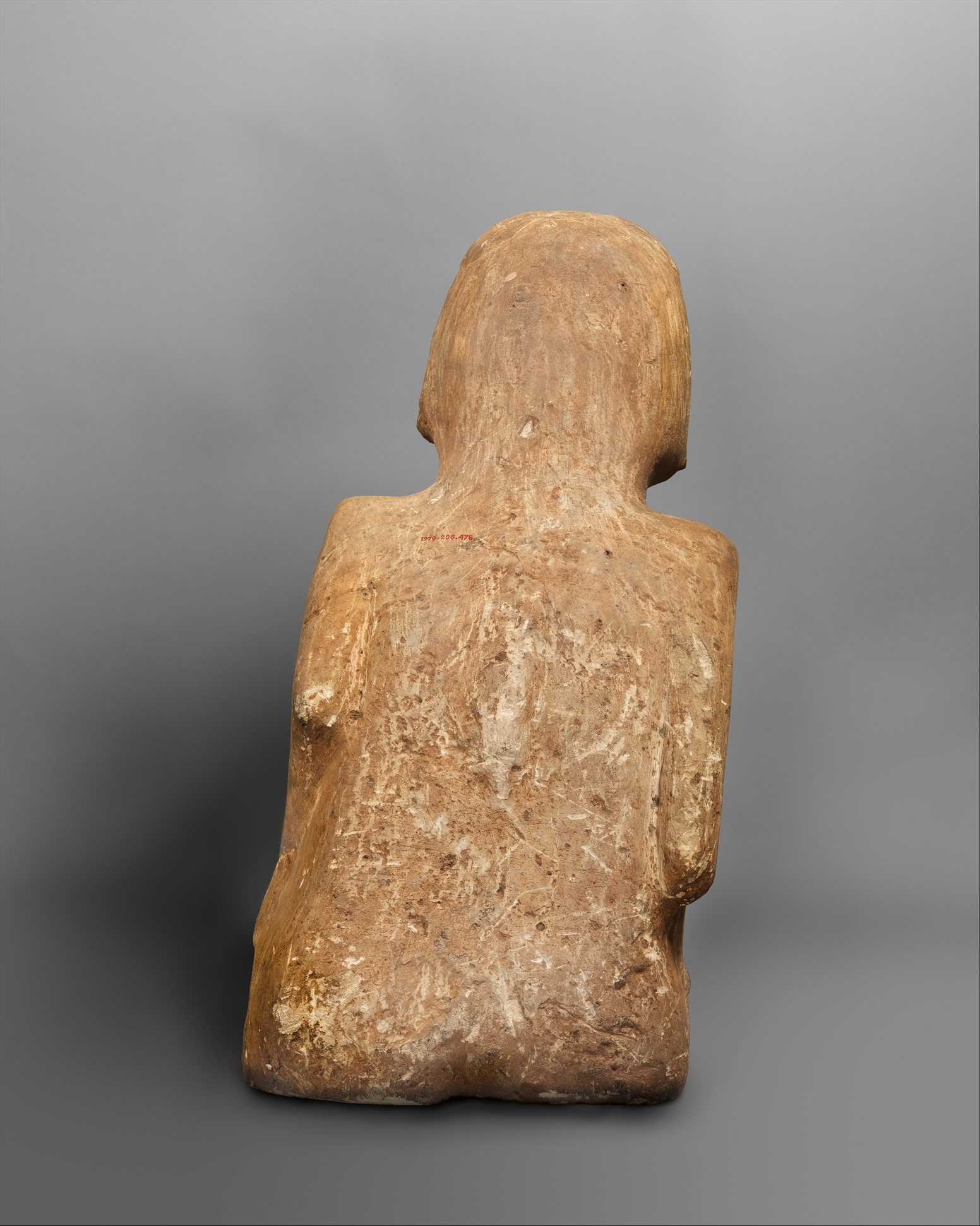
Rear view of the "Adam" statue

== See also ==
- Angel Mounds
- Annis Mound
- Chucalissa
- Mound Bottom
- Obion Mounds
- Sellars Farm site
