= Starr Village and Mound Group =

Mississippian culture archaeological site

- Location in Illinois today
- 39.20055°N 90.01369°W
- Cultures: Mississippian culture
- Location: Southwest of Carlinville in Macoupin County, Illinois.
- Region: Central Illinois

The Starr Village and Mound Group (11MP3), is a Mississippian culture archaeological site located on a bluff overlooking Macoupin Creek southwest of Carlinville in Macoupin County, Illinois.

== Artifacts ==
The "Macoupin Creek figurine" (formerly the "Piasa Creek Figure pipe") is a Mississippian stone statue found at the site in a stone box grave sometime late in the nineteenth century. It measures 20.3 centimeters (8.0 in) in height and depicts a shaman kneeling with a gourd rattle in one hand and a snake or snakeskin wrapped around his neck. The figure also has conch shell and bead ear ornaments and a raccoon skin headdress.

Because of the age of the burial (Early Sand Prairie Phase 1250 CE) and the time of the statue's believed manufacture (Stirling Phase 1050 to 1200 CE), it is posited that the figure was a curated heirloom, buried long after its manufacture. It is now in the collection of the Gilcrease Museum in Tulsa, Oklahoma.

== See also ==
- Cahokia
- Emerald Mound and Village Site
- Ware Mounds and Village Site
