= Brick Church Mound and Village Site =

Archeological site in Tennessee, USA

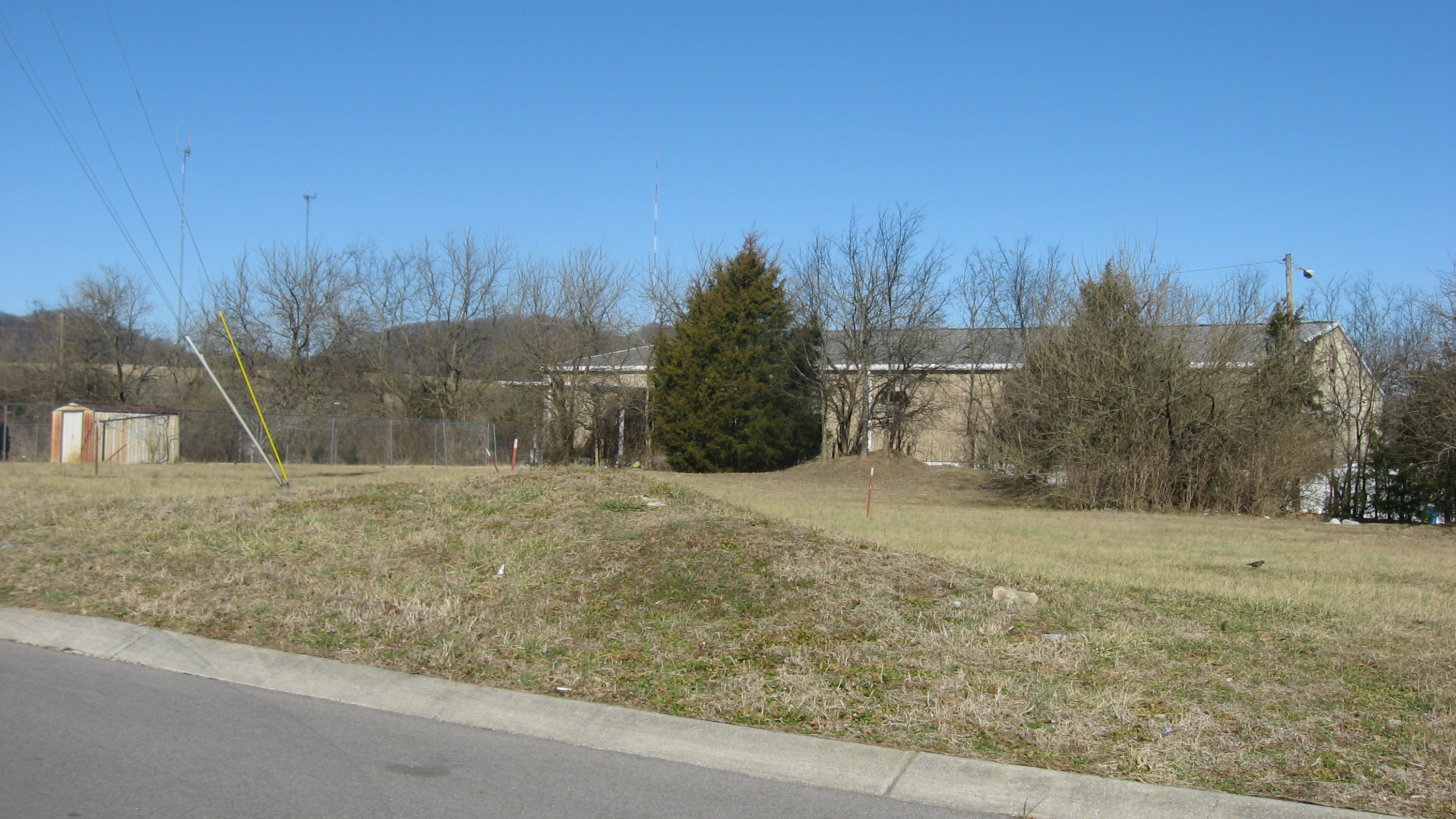
- A small section of undeveloped land

- Location within Tennessee today, marker is former position of Mound A
- 36°14′50.89″N 86°46′32.48″W
- Cultures: Mississippian culture
- Location: Nashville, Tennessee, Davidson County, Tennessee, USA

History
- Built: 1000 CE
- Abandoned: 1499

Site notes
- Architectural styles: Platform mounds, palisade,
- Excavation dates: 1877, 1969, 1971-2001
- Archaeologists: Frederic Ward Putnam

The Brick Church Mound and Village Site (40DV39) (also known as the Love Mounds and the Brick Church Pike Mound Site) is a Mississippian culture archaeological site located in Nashville in Davidson County, Tennessee. It was excavated in the late nineteenth century by Frederic Ward Putnam. During excavations in the early 1970s, the site produced a unique cache of ceramic figurines very similar in style to Mississippian stone statuary which are now on display at the Frank H. McClung Museum. It was added to the National Register of Historic Places (NRHP) on May 7, 1973 as NRIS number 73001759 although this did not save the site from being almost totally destroyed by residential development.

== Site ==
Like many other sites in central Tennessee during the Mississippian period the Brick Church Pike Mounds Site was a multi-mound village with an encircling defensive palisade. The site had a large platform mound (Mound A) 23 feet (7.0 m) high and 155 feet (47 m) on the north–south axis by 147 feet (45 m)on the east–west axis and several smaller mounds. On a ridge next to the mound were many stone box graves of a type found throughout the Cumberland region. Most sites during this time and in this general area were located along tributary streams of major rivers. Larger sites such as this were not drastically different from the dispersed hamlets of their hinterlands but they did offer increased protection during times of instability. While politically autonomous from each other, sites in the area still shared a material cultural with other sites in the region such as Sellars, Old Town, and Mound Bottom. Brick Church Pike Mounds was first described and excavated in 1877 by Frederic Ward Putnam and given a brief mention in the writings of William E. Myer in the early twentieth century though it is unclear if he actually visited it. After this the site remained mostly undisturbed except for farming until the latter half of the twentieth century. During the last 30 years of the twentieth century the site was almost completely destroyed, razed for the building of a residential area and the Ewing Baptist Church, although salvage archaeology did take place.

== Excavations ==
In 1877 a crew of 6 to 8 men led by Putnam tunneled into Mound A looking for an interior burial chamber. Upon not finding one, they then filled in their excavations and restored the shape of the mound. Putnam noted many of the features of the site when he published his findings in 1878. The site would not be professionally investigated again for almost a century. In the summer of 1969 Dr. Charle Fletcher of Vanderbilt University conducted a field school and did limited archaeological sampling at the site, although the results of his studies remain unpublished. A few years later in the summer of 1971 a local youth discovered a unique set of ceramic figurines at the site. John Dowd, a respected avocational archaeologist from Nashville, was contacted and after visiting the location started the first photographically recorded excavations at the site. In the fall 1971 Mack Prichard the State of Tennessee's first modern state archaeologist visited the site and was instrumental in getting it added to the NRHP but was not able to raise the funds need to buy and save the site form residential development. In 1983 the rest of the site not already destroyed was purchased for the purposes of building a new residential neighborhood. Over the next several years a series of salvage archaeology operations were undertaken by Robert Jolley and later the Division of Archaeology. Throughout the 1980s, 1990s and early 2000s periodic excavations took place as the site was further developed, especially after changes in state law afforded Native American graves protections equal to Euro-American graves and forced the construction companies to do archaeological surveys to find possible grave sites.

=== Important finds ===
In 1971 an unusual and unique set of ceramic figurines was discovered in the platform-like ridge adjacent to Mound A. Excavations by John Dowd at the site of their discovery revealed a 17 feet (5.2 m) by 8 feet (2.4 m) clay floor from a Mississippian period house that had burned down. The figurines themselves were of an adult male and adult female pair and two children of each sex, as well as pieces from additional figurines. In total, pieces of 11 whole or partial figures were discovered in the house floor. The male has an elaborate hair style which includes the beaded forelock seen on figures in Southeastern Ceremonial Complex warrior images. The figures sit in a cross-legged fashion, with their hands on their knees, similar to Mississippian stone statuary found throughout the Tennessee-Cumberland region. Dowd was eventually able to acquire the figurines from the young man who had discovered them and has loaned them to the Frank H. McClung Museum of the University of Tennessee in Knoxville, where they are on display.

Excavations throughout the 1970s by Jolley turned up many examples of Mississippian culture pottery, including two common varieties Mississippi Plain or Neelys Ferry Plain. Other finer wares were also found including examples Bell Plain, Kimmswick Fabric Impressed, Manly Punctate, Matthews Incised, a hooded water bottle fragment, one plate fragment with a grooved rim, several ceramic disks and a ceramic cylinder. Numerous examples of stone tools were found, including several hoes and a dagger of Dover chert. Excavations of a midden deposit in October 1999 produced a wealth of cultural material, including a unique perforated owl effigy rattle.

== See also ==
- Mississippian stone statuary
- List of Mississippian sites
- Southeastern Ceremonial Complex
