= Earth/fertility cult =

Cult associated with the Mississippian culture

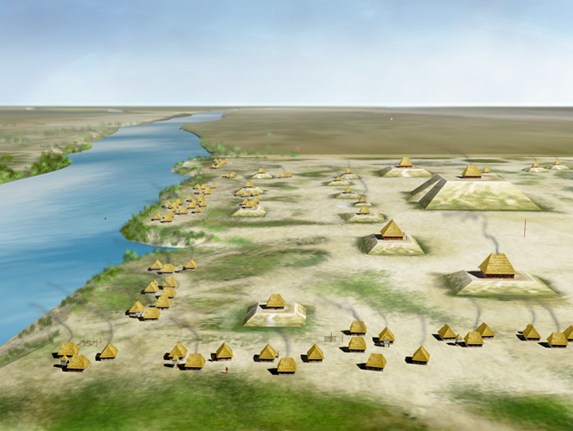
Platform mounds at the Holly Bluff site

The Earth/fertility Mississippian cult was associated with earthen platform mounds.

The act of rebuilding the mounds, of adding additional layers of earth over burials, served as a symbol of renewal, which renewed the earthwork as much as human life. The earthen platform served as the earth, a symbolism which endured into historic times. There are historically documented connections between additions to platforms mounds and the communal "Green Corn Ceremony", which celebrated the new harvest and the fertility of the earth. The quadrilateral, flat-topped design of many platform mounds may represent the Southeastern American Indian belief that the earth was a flat surface oriented towards four quarters of the world.

== See also ==
- Mississippian stone statuary
