= Denmark Mound Group =

Historic site in Tennessee, United States

- Denmark Site
- Location in Tennessee today
- 35.50832°N 89.03041°W
- Cultures: Mississippian culture
- Location: Denmark, Madison County, Tennessee, USA
- Region: West Tennessee

Site notes
- Architectural style
- Denmark Mound Group (40MD85)
- U.S. National Register of Historic Places
- NRHP reference No.: 92001656
- Added to NRHP: December 7, 1992

The Denmark Mound Group or Denmark Site (40MD85) is a Mississippian culture archaeological site on a low bluff overlooking Big Black Creek, a tributary of the Hatchie River near Denmark in Madison County, Tennessee. The site features include a village with over 70 structures, 2 rectangular platform mounds and a small conical burial mound as well as possible evidence of a surrounding palisade. The site was added to the NRHP in 1992.

== See also ==
- Annis Mound
- Chucalissa
- Obion Mounds
