= Castalian Springs Mound Site =

Archaeological site in Tennessee, US

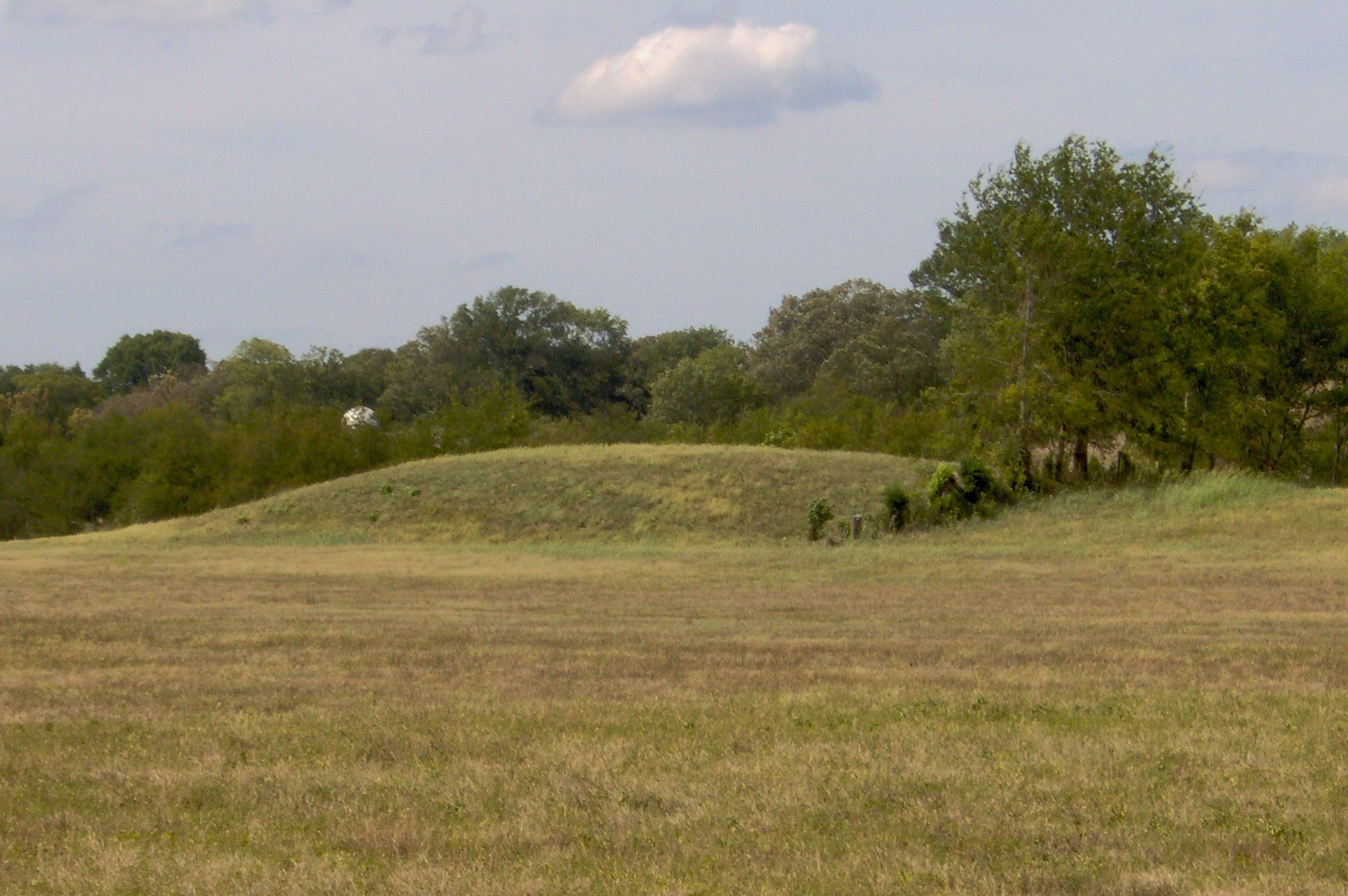

- Location within Tennessee today
- 36°23′54.96″N 86°18′48.60″W
- Cultures: Mississippian culture
- Location: Castalian Springs, Tennessee, Sumner County, Tennessee, USA
- Region: Sumner County, Tennessee

History
- Built: 1100 CE
- Abandoned: 1350

Site notes
- Architectural styles: Platform mounds, burial mound, palisade, plaza
- Excavation dates: 1891, 1893, 1916-1917, 2005-2011, 2017-2025
- Archaeologists: William E. Myer, Kevin E. Smith, Paul N. Eubanks

== Overview ==
The Castalian Springs Mound State Archaeological Area (40SU14) (also known as Bledsoe's Lick) is a Mississippian culture archaeological site located near the unincorporated community of Castalian Springs in Sumner County, Tennessee. The site was first excavated in the 1890s and has been investigated through multiple archaeological field schools between 2005–2011 and 2017–2025. Notable finds from the site include several examples of Mississippian stone statuary and the Castalian Springs shell gorget, now held by the National Museum of the American Indian. The site is owned by the State of Tennessee and managed by the Tennessee Historical Commission. It is not currently open to the public.

== Site ==
The Castalian Springs site is the largest of four Mississippian mound centers on the eastern edge of the Nashville Basin, located on a flood terrace overlooking Lick Creek, a tributary of the Cumberland River.

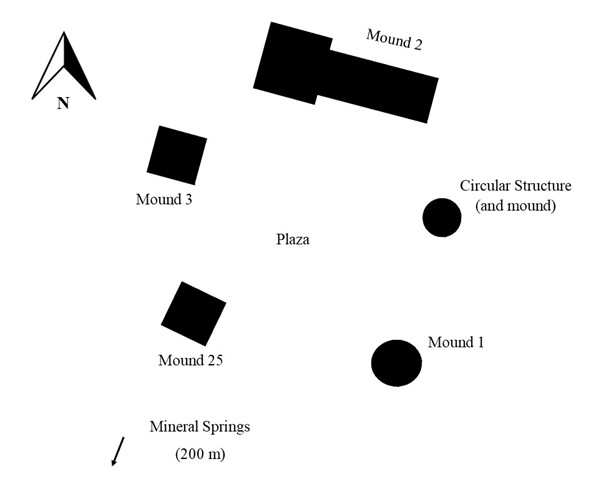
Schematic Map of The Central Ceremonial Precinct at Castalian Springs

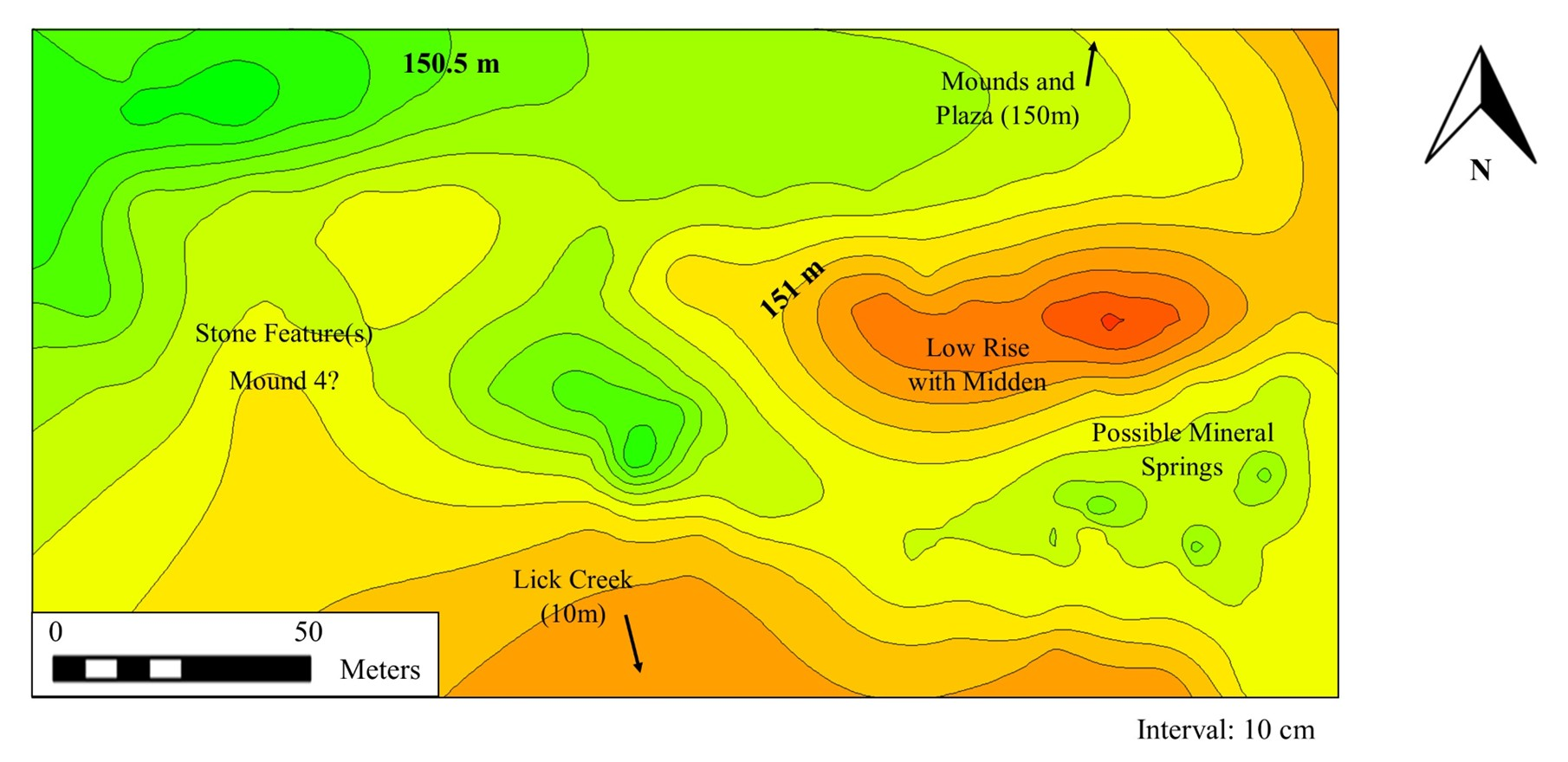
Topographic Map of Bledsoe's Lick

Occupation at the site dates from approximately 1100 to 1350 CE, with the principal ceremonial use occurring between about 1200 and 1350 CE.

Rather than a densely nucleated town, Castalian Springs appears to have functioned primarily as a civic-ceremonial center focused on a central plaza and mound complex. The precinct encompassed roughly 40 acres (0.16 km²) and included approximately a dozen platform mounds. At least five of these were arranged around a central plaza, while others were positioned nearby within the broader ceremonial landscape.

The site was first documented in the early 1820s by Ralph E. W. Earl, who conducted informal excavations and described the remains of an earthen embankment enclosing approximately 16 acres (0.065 km²). Earl’s observations were later published by John Haywood, who recorded the embankment and associated earthworks in his 1823 history of Tennessee. The embankment likely supported a wooden palisade and may have been reinforced by raised earthen towers.

Haywood also described the principal mound (Mound 2) as a large rectangular platform approximately 55 m by 55 m and about 4–5 m in height, aligned east–west, with a secondary conical mound rising from its western end.

South of Mound 2 lay the central plaza, bordered on the east by Mound 1, a circular platform mound approximately 26 m in diameter and standing just over 1 m in height at present, and on the west by Mound 3, another platform mound overlooking the plaza. A smaller mound (Mound 25) has recently been identified within the central precinct, representing an additional construction episode within the ceremonial landscape.

Geophysical survey and excavation have documented a large circular wall-trench structure and low mound within the central precinct, interpreted as a substantial public building that was later intentionally dismantled and covered with mound fill, suggesting an important ceremonial role within the site’s civic landscape.

Outside the palisaded precinct, just north of Lick Creek, was a stone mound (Mound 4) measuring about 18 m in diameter and 1.7 m in height. Similar stone constructions are known from the Beasley Mounds, Sellars Indian Mound, and the Kelley’s Battery site.

Approximately 200 m south of the mound complex are the mineral springs historically known as Bledsoe’s Lick. These springs formed an important focal point within the broader landscape, attracting wildlife and human activity for centuries. Archaeological and historical evidence suggests the springs served as a gathering place for feasting, ceremony, and social interaction tied to the ceremonial center.

Immediately north of the springs is a linear earthen embankment measuring roughly 80 m east–west by 40 m north–south and standing just under one meter in height in its present form. This earthwork is interpreted as a constructed space associated with communal activities such as feasting, ceremonies, games, and possibly dancing.

The principal mound and faint surface traces of others remain visible, although much of the site’s relief has been reduced by agricultural activity. Subsurface investigations continue to reveal additional architectural remains linked to the ceremonial complex.

== Excavations ==
In the early 1890s and again in 1916–1917, amateur archaeologist William E. Myer (later a “special archeologist” with the Smithsonian) excavated portions of the site, including stone box graves and one of the principal mounds. Myer recovered several artifacts containing Southeastern Ceremonial Complex imagery, including shell gorgets later acquired by the National Museum of the American Indian in 1926.

The State of Tennessee purchased the site in 2005, and systematic archaeological investigations resumed under the direction of Middle Tennessee State University. Dr. Kevin E. Smith directed archaeological field schools at the site from 2005 through 2011.

Field investigations resumed in 2017 under the direction of Paul N. Eubanks of Middle Tennessee State University. From 2017 to 2019, MTSU field schools conducted excavations in the vicinity of the mineral springs at Bledsoe’s Lick, focusing on activity areas associated with the broader ceremonial landscape. Subsequent field seasons between 2022 and 2025 concentrated on investigations at Mound 25, a smaller mound within the central precinct, documenting additional construction episodes and architectural features within the mound complex.

== Important finds ==
A number of Mississippian stone statues have been recovered at the site, the earliest being noted prior to 1823. Since then several additional examples have been documented, including one believed to have been removed from the platform section of the main mound and others from associated village areas.

In 1892 an etched limestone tablet was discovered at the site by Myer. Measuring 9 inches (23 cm) by 12 inches (30 cm), the tablet is engraved with symbolic imagery associated with the S.E.C.C., specifically the upper torso of a human figure ceremonially dressed as a raptorial bird with a sun symbol on its chest. The iconography closely resembles depictions of the falcon dancer found on Mississippian copper plates excavated across the Midwest and Southeast. The tablet was the second of only six such tablets known from the Central Tennessee region.

Another engraved stone, the Thruston tablet, was discovered in 1878 along Rocky Creek in what is now Trousdale County, Tennessee. The tablet measures 19 inches (48 cm) wide by 14 inches (36 cm) tall and 1 inch (2.5 cm) thick and depicts multiple figures dressed in S.E.C.C. regalia on both sides. It is named for Gates P. Thruston, a Nashville lawyer and avocational archaeologist who promoted its study and publication. The tablet is currently housed in the collection of the Tennessee State Museum in Nashville.

Myer also recovered a cache of more than thirty engraved shell gorgets, several of which are now held by the National Museum of the American Indian. One of the most notable examples is carved in the Eddyville or Braden style, a style associated with the Cahokia polity near Collinsville, Illinois. The gorget depicts a warrior figure holding a ceremonial mace in one hand and a severed head in the other. The figure also bears the Forked Eye Surround, Bellows apron, and Bi-Lobed Arrow motifs associated with the S.E.C.C. Falcon dancer. Holes drilled along the edge indicate that the ornament was intended to be worn with the figure oriented sideways. Also present in the cache were two Cox-style and two Nashville I–style gorgets.

In 2005 a waterline replacement crew working along the right-of-way of State Route 25 discovered an intact Cox-style gorget carved from dark gray shale. This artifact is one of the few examples of a Cox-style motif executed on a material other than marine shell.

The Castalian Springs site is also one of only three sites in Middle Tennessee where ceramic sherds of the type known as Angel negative painted have been identified. This variety of Mississippian culture pottery is typically associated with Angel phase sites along the Ohio River.

== See also ==
- Bledsoe's Station
- List of Mississippian sites
- Southeastern Ceremonial Complex
