= Sellars Farm Site =

Archaeological site in Tennessee, United States

- Sellars Farm state archaeological area, Sellars Indian mound
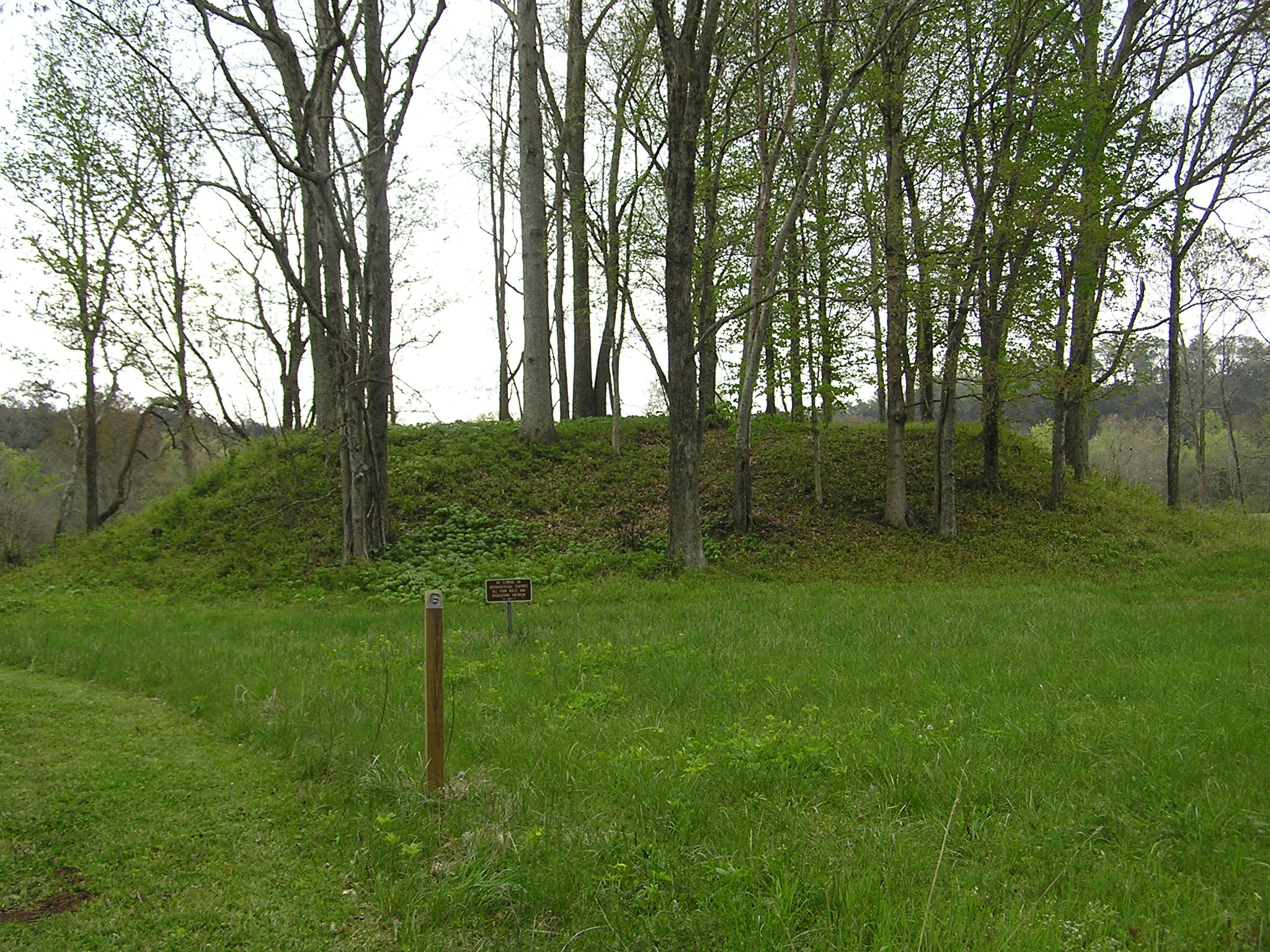
- The main mound at the site

- Location within Tennessee
- 36°10′12.1″N 86°14′26.37″W
- Cultures: Mississippian culture
- Location: Lebanon, Tennessee, Wilson County, Tennessee, USA
- Region: Middle Tennessee

History
- Built: 1000 CE
- Abandoned: 1300 CE

Site notes
- Architectural style: platform mound Number of temples: 1
- Sellars Indian Mound
- U.S. National Register of Historic Places
- NRHP reference No.: 72001256
- Responsible body: State of Tennessee

Sellars Farm Site (40WI1), also known as the Sellars Farm state archaeological area and Sellars Indian mound, is a Mississippian culture archaeological site located in Wilson County, Tennessee, near Lebanon. The platform mound was the site of a settlement from about 1000 to 1300 CE. Today, the site is a satellite unit of Long Hunter State Park. The non-profit Friends of the Sellars Farm State Archaeological Area organization conducts tours and upkeep of the site. It was listed on the National Register of Historic Places on December 11, 1972.

Numerous sandstone figurines have been unearthed on the site. One of these statues, known as "Sandy," was featured on a United States postage stamp. and is the official State Artifact of Tennessee.

== See also ==
- Duck River cache
- Chucalissa
- Link Farm Mound
- Mound Bottom
- Obion Mounds
