= Towosahgy State Historic Site =

Archaeological site in the U.S. state of Missouri

- Beckwith's Fort Archeological Site
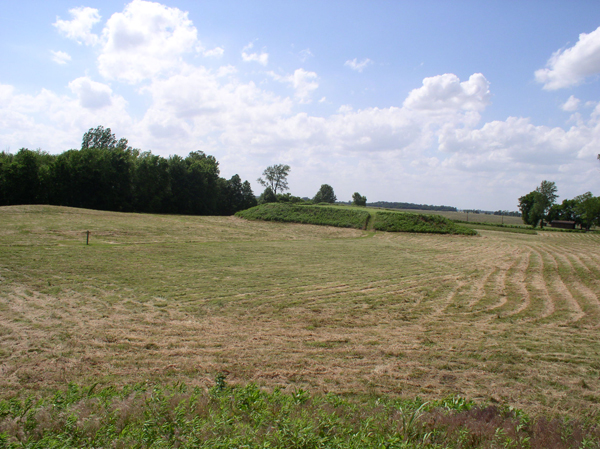
- Towosahgy Site main platform mound

- Location in Missouri today Towosahgy State Historic Site (the United States)
- 36°41′36″N 89°14′08″W
- Cultures: Mississippian culture
- Location: Mississippi County, Missouri, United States
- Region: Missouri Bootheel

Site notes
- Architectural style: platform mound
- Beckwith's Fort Archeological Site
- U.S. National Register of Historic Places
- Area: 116 acres (47 ha)
- NRHP reference No.: 69000113
- Added to NRHP: July 29, 1969

Towosahgy State Historic Site
- Interactive map of Towosahgy State Historic Site
- Elevation: 299 ft (91 m)
- Established: 1967
- Visitors: 2,383 (in 2022)
- Governing body: Missouri Department of Natural Resources
- Website: Towosahgy State Historic Site

Towosahgy State Historic Site (23MI2), also known as Beckwith's Fort Archeological Site, is a large Mississippian archaeological site with a Woodland period Baytown culture component located in Mississippi County, Missouri, United States. It is believed to have been inhabited from c. 400–1350 CE. The site is maintained by the Missouri Department of Natural Resources as a state historic site. The name Towosahgy is an Osage word which means "old town". It is not known if members of the historic Osage people, who dominated a large area of present-day Missouri at the beginning of the 19th century, ever occupied the site. The site was acquired by the Missouri state park system in 1967 and added to the National Register of Historic Places in 1969 as NRIS number 69000113.

== History of Towosahgy ==
The earliest portion of Towosahgy State Historic Site is in the southern half, where a Late Woodland period village once stood. Wilkie dates this component to about 400 to 700 CE.

Later the site was fortified and built up as a Mississippian village with seven platform mounds, most surrounding a central plaza area. During this time, the site was surrounded by a palisade wall of vertical logs and a moat. Like other Mississippian mound centers, Towosahgy also had a borrow pit from which earth was removed to create the mounds. The largest remaining mound in the complex is Mound 2, also known as the "temple mound". Excavations on this part of the site were conducted in 1989 by James Price. The site was abandoned during the late 14th century for unknown reasons, as were many similar Mississippian sites in the region.

Ceramics from the site represent typical pottery found in the Missouri Bootheel region. Sherds from the Woodland occupation are typically grog tempered. The later Mississippian culture pottery is shell tempered. Type varieties identified include Baytown Plain and Mulberry Creek Cordmarked. Mississippian ceramics were also both plain and decorated. Punctuated, incised, fabric impressed, and red, black, and brown painted/slipped sherds, typical decorating methods, are all present. A large collection of ceramic vessels from the site are part of the Beckwith Collection displayed at the Rosemary Berkel and Harry L. Crisp II Museum at Southeast Missouri State University.

== See also ==
- Kincaid Mounds
- Ware Mounds
- Wickliffe Mounds
