= Ware Mounds and Village Site =

Archaeological site in Illinois, United States

- Running Lake Site
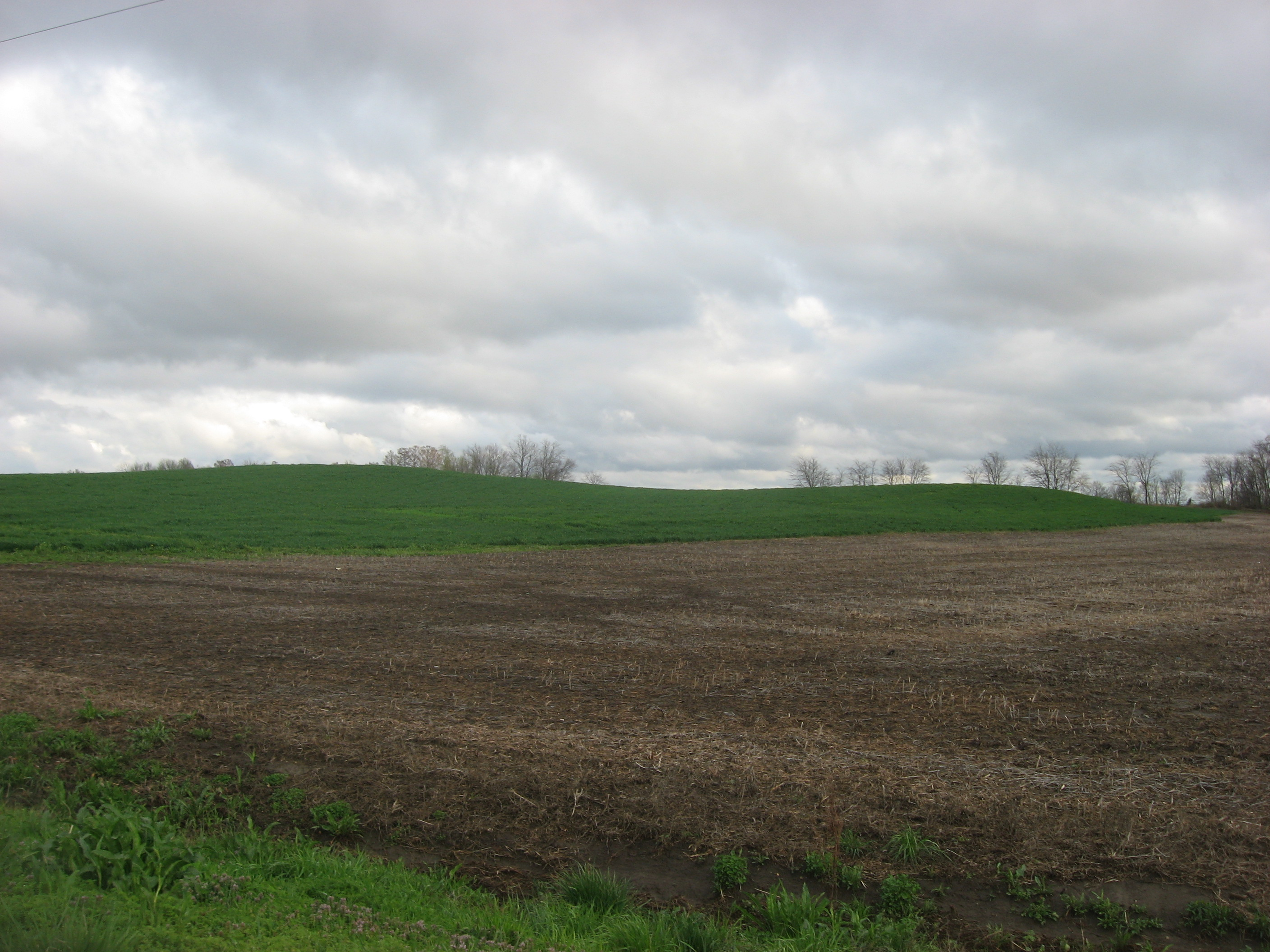

- Location in Illinois today
- 37°26′47″N 89°24′00″W
- Cultures: Mississippian culture
- Location: Ware, Union County, Illinois, USA
- Region: Southern Illinois

Site notes
- Architectural styles
- Ware Mounds and Village Site (11 U 31)
- U.S. National Register of Historic Places
- Area: 160 acres (65 ha)
- NRHP reference No.: 77000490
- Added to NRHP: October 18, 1977

The Ware Mounds and Village Site (11U31), also known as the Running Lake Site, located west of Ware, Illinois, is an archaeological site comprising three platform mounds and a 160-acre (65 ha) village site. The site was inhabited by the Late Woodland and Mississippian cultures from c. 800 to c. 1300. The village may be the only Mississippian village known to have existed in the Mississippi River valley in Southern Illinois. As the village was located near two major sources of chert, which Mississippian cultures used to make agricultural tools, it was likely a trading center for the mineral.

The first of the site's three mounds is 200 feet (61 m) in diameter. The graves of indigenous peoples have been found in this mound, which was later used as a cemetery by European settlers. The second mound is 75 feet (23 m) in diameter, while the third is 250 feet (76 m) long and 150 feet (46 m) wide. A fourth mound, which was smaller than the other three, was originally located at the site but was demolished by the construction of Illinois Route 3.

The site was added to the National Register of Historic Places on October 18, 1977.

== Stone statue ==
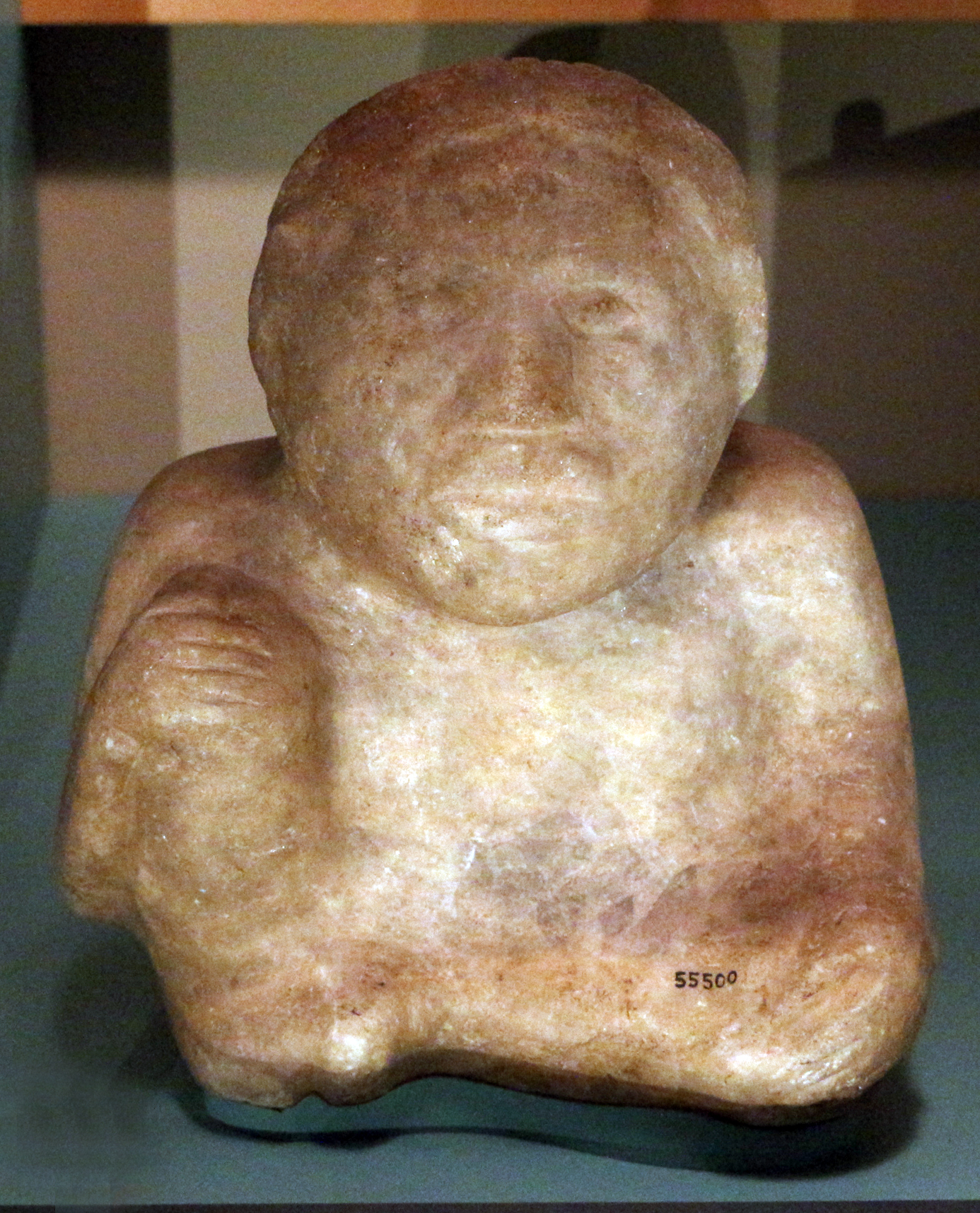
"Anna", the Running Lake Site statue

A Mississippian culture stone statue made of fluorite was found buried in Mound 1 by Thomas Perrine in 1873 and nicknamed "Anna". The specimen shows many similarities to other examples found at Angel Mounds near Evansville, Indiana and Obion Mounds near Paris, Tennessee. It is now part of the collection of the Field Museum of Natural History in Chicago, Illinois.

== See also ==
- Kincaid Mounds
- Towosahgy
- Wickliffe Mounds
- List of archaeological sites on the National Register of Historic Places in Illinois
