= Obion Mounds =

- Obion Mounds (40 HY 14)
- U.S. National Register of Historic Places
- Location within Tennessee
- Location: Henry County, Tennessee
- Nearest city: Paris, Tennessee
- Coordinates: 36°24′19.87″N 88°22′56.64″W
- NRHP reference No.: 73001790
- Added to NRHP: May 7, 1973

Obion Mounds (40 HY 14), also known as the Work Farm Site, is an archaeological site of the Mississippian culture located north of Paris, Henry County, Tennessee, on the north fork of the Obion River. The site is the largest Mississippian site in western Tennessee and was probably inhabited by 1000 to 1100 CE. and abandoned by 1300. It consists of seven platform mounds surrounding a plaza measuring 200 feet (61 m) by 900 feet (270 m). The largest mound at the site was 500 feet (150 m) wide by 30 feet (9.1 m) tall with a ramp leading to its summit. At one point the mounds and plaza were surrounded with a wooden palisade. The site also has 2 depressions thought to be borrow pits from which the soil to construct the mounds was taken. In 1845 the owner of the site, Solomon Hartsfield, was digging in one of the borrow pits when he discovered a stone statue. The statue was later damaged in a house fire during the late 19th century and only its head now remains. It is the only Mississippian site in western Tennessee to have produced such a statue. Similar statues have been found at the Angel Mounds site near Evansville, Indiana and the Ware Mounds site in Union County, Illinois.

== See also ==
- Denmark Mound Group
- Kincaid Mounds
