= Bessemer Site =

Historic site in Alabama, United States

- Talley Mounds, Jonesboro Mounds
- Location in Alabama today
- 33.38935°N 87.01035°W
- Cultures: South Appalachian Mississippian culture
- Location: Jefferson County, Alabama, USA
- Region: Central Alabama

The Bessemer Site, also known as the Talley Mounds and the Jonesboro Mounds, is a South Appalachian Mississippian culture archaeological site located near the confluence of Halls Mill Creek and Valley Creek (a tributary of the Black Warrior River), west of downtown Bessemer in Jefferson County, Alabama. The site was occupied in the early Mississippian period from about 1150 to 1250 CE.

== See also ==
- Bottle Creek Mounds
- Moundville site
- Jere Shine site
- Taskigi Mound
