= Brentwood Library Site =

Mississippian culture archaeological site

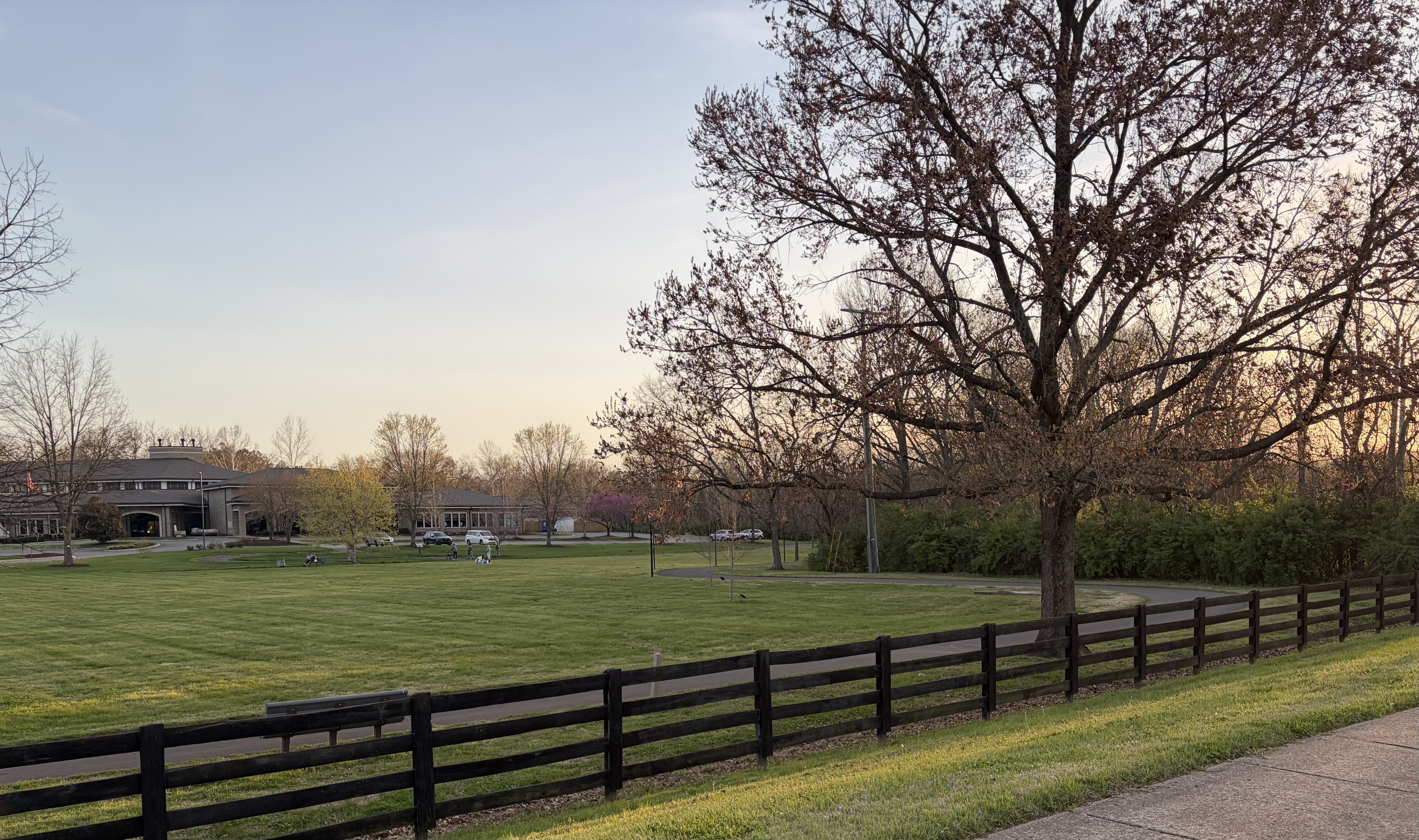
- A view of the Brentwood Library site's general area, with the Little Harpeth River to the right and the library to the left

- Location within Tennessee today
- 35°59′45.06″N 86°47′23.60″W
- Cultures: Mississippian culture
- Location: Williamson County, Tennessee, United States

Site notes
- Excavation dates: 1997
- Responsible body: City of Brentwood

The Brentwood Library Site (40WM210), also known as the Jarman Farm Site, is a Mississippian culture archaeological site located in the city of Brentwood, in Williamson County, Tennessee. The substantial town was occupied during Regional Period IV of the local Mississippian chronology, and there was an associated burial ground, where nearly 50 stone box graves have been found. Artifacts from the site have been radiocarbon dated to between 1298 and 1465 CE. These include several types of Mississippian pottery, with Beckwith Incised found in the highest number.

== Excavations ==
The Brentwood Library Site is located on a low ridge next to the Harpeth River and a small spring-fed creek. The site was first mentioned by Frederic Ward Putnam as part of a Harvard Peabody Museum Expedition in 1882, but the exact location was not mentioned. Putnam excavated forty-eight stone box graves at the site. At least one example of a Nashville style shell gorget was found by Putnam during his excavations of an infant's grave, along with a notched-rim bowl, a human effigy-hooded bottle, and eight marine shell beads.

The site was essentially forgotten until 1997, when construction for the new Brentwood library uncovered remains of a substantial Mississippian town and associated burial area. Professional archeological excavations were undertaken at the site to document these finds.

=== Ceramics ===
Mississippian culture pottery vessels and sherds found at the site were made with techniques and forms found across the Mississippian world. Common shapes include bowls with notched rim straps and jars with a direct rim. Strap handles were the only closed handle style found, although bifurcate and tabular lugs were sometimes attached. Some sherds were found to be fabric impressed. Other artifacts were made with a technique known as negative painting. The background was painted, enabling the natural buff or grey of the clay to create the positive image. Notable pottery classifications found were examples of Mound Place Incised, Matthews Incised var. Matthews, Manly Incised, and Beckwith Incised; examples of Beckwith Incised was found in the largest numbers. A few pieces of effigy pottery were also found, mostly of zoomorphic figures such as fish, frogs, and ducks, although some examples with anthropomorphic shapes were found. These humans effigies often depicted a standing woman with top-knots in her hair, a pronounced hunchback and ear spools. Similar ceramic and stone statues are found throughout the Middle Tennessee area.

== See also ==
- Fewkes Group Archaeological Site (40 WM 1)
- Old Town Archaeological Site (40 WM 2)
- List of Mississippian sites
