= Jaketown Site =

Archaeological site in Humphreys County, Mississippi, United States

- U.S. National Register of Historic Places
- U.S. National Historic Landmark
- Mississippi Landmark
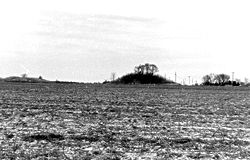
- Roadside view of the site

- Location within Mississippi Location within the United States
- Nearest city: Belzoni, Mississippi
- Coordinates: 33°14′13.542″N 90°29′13.2936″W
- Area: 200 acres (81 ha)
- NRHP reference No.: 73001017

Significant dates
- Added to NRHP: June 19, 1973
- Designated NHL: December 14, 1990
- Designated USMS: December 6, 1985

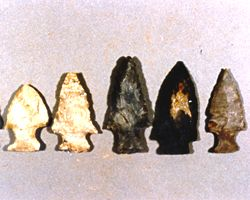
Arrowheads from the Jaketown Site

Jaketown Site (22 HU 505) is an archaeological site with two prehistoric earthwork mounds in Humphreys County, Mississippi, United States. While the mounds have not been excavated, distinctive pottery shards found in the area lead scholars to date the mounds' construction and use to the Mississippian culture period, roughly 1100 CE to 1500 CE.

The site was a complex regional trade center that developed and was inhabited much earlier, from 2000 to 600 BCE, during the Poverty Point culture within the Late Archaic period of the United States. This culture is seen in more than 100 sites on both sides of the Mississippi River, from present-day Louisiana to Mississippi; it also was linked to more distant areas through a trading network. The site has evidence of trade in raw materials and manufacture of finished items that were distributed through the network throughout the Eastern United States. The largest and most elaborate earthwork complex of the period is at Poverty Point, Louisiana.

The mounds were constructed as part of a later, succeeding culture, built to mark the political and religious center of a chiefdom. There would have been numerous elite residences nearby, as well as structures to support certain crafts. Because of its importance of a regional trade center of the Poverty Point culture in the Archaic period, and long human occupation, the site was declared a National Historic Landmark in 1990. The mounds are listed on the Mississippi Mound Trail. It is managed by the state of Mississippi. Mississippi Highway 7 is routed near the site, which is approximately seven miles north of Belzoni.

Artifacts found in the area near the site are featured on display in the Jaketown Museum in Belzoni. Dating of the artifacts has demonstrated that the Jaketown site was occupied by indigenous peoples from 1750 BCE to 1500 CE, making it one of the oldest continuously inhabited sites in the region.

Archeological investigations have found that the smaller mounds nearby were hundreds of years older than the surviving two; they were built by peoples of a preceding culture. They were destroyed by plowing and being razed for use as fill for road construction in the early 20th century. The largest platform mound at the site, Mound B, is 23 feet (7.0 m) in height with a base of 150 feet (46 m) by 200 feet (61 m). It has a projection on its eastern side that is thought to have been a ramp once used as a stairway. To its northwest is Mound C, another platform mound with a height of 15 feet (4.6 m).

== See also ==
- List of Mississippian sites
