= Punk Rock Shelter =

Archaeological site in Putnam County, Georgia

- Location within Georgia
- 33°23′29.51″N 83°11′21.59″W
- Cultures: South Appalachian Mississippian culture
- Location: Putnam County, Georgia, United States
- Region: Putnam County, Georgia

Site notes
- Excavation dates: 1978

The Punk Rock Shelter (9PM211) was an archaeological site found in Putnam County, Georgia. The site flooded in 1979, putting it 65 feet (20 m) under Lake Oconee. Despite its name, it was not a rock shelter, but instead a jumble of granite boulders or tors. These tors happened to create a shelter-like area. Due to poor land management in the 19th and 20th century associated with cotton farming, the shelter floor area is now underneath at least a meter deep of red clay and silt mud. The Native Americans at the site were most likely Hitchiti in ancestry.

== Discovery ==
The Punk Rock Shelter was discovered by Greg Paulk and Dean Wood on November 15, 1974. They discovered it while conducting the Wallace Reservoir Archaeological Survey.

== Excavation ==
On November 18, John Doolin accompanied Paulk and Chester DePratter to excavate a 1 by 2 meter deep trench between the back wall and the front entrance of the shelter. On November 20, Wood and DePratter returned to excavate a midden in the trench. On November 21, Wood and DePratter brought Paulk and Doolin to extend the trench 1 meter north, making it a 1 by 3 meter trench. On November 22, all four returned to do a detailed excavation of the eastern part of the trench with photographs, drawings, and backfill.

The final excavation of the site was proposed in spring of 1977 within the Wallace Reservoir sites listed to be "more thoroughly excavated." From June 14 to August 10, 1978, Mark Williams led this final excavation, and it was an expansion on DePratter's 1974 excavation. According to this final excavation, the maximum size of the shelter is 7.5 meters long and 4.5 meters wide.

The most peculiar find during this excavation was a large amount of quartz pebbles (usually found alongside concentrated areas of potsherds). These quartz pebbles were red. In Williams's previous research, he shows that red quartz usually meant that the pebbles were directly exposed to fire potentially for the use of indirect heating.

== Dating ==
Through the analyses of the ceramic vessels and potsherds, the site dates to the Lamar and Savannah periods of the overarching Mississippian Period. The Punk Rock Shelter is the only known site producing a large collection of vessels from the Lamar and Savannah periods in the Oconee Valley.

The vessels found in the Punk Rock Shelter span over a single phase (Scull Shoals) in the Savannah period and all four phases of the Lamar period (Duvall, Iron Horse, Dyar, and Bell). Traditional seriation was used to determine the dates of the Mississippian phases. Overall, the potsherds and the site would fall in between A.D. 1250 – A.D. 1650.

Distribution-wise in concern to the potsherds over the span of phases, Williams' report shows that potsherds were relatively evenly present in all the phases. This provides evidence that the shelter was used consistently over 400 years.

== Use ==
Potsherds show that site was used repeatedly over a long time. There was a lack of flora and faunal remains (other than burnt wood), lithic material, and structural remains making it unlikely that people lived or stayed there for long periods at a time. There was a large number of red quartz pebbles in correlation to areas with large amounts of potsherds.

Williams recognizes that there are six potential explanations behind the usage of the Punk Rock Shelter:

1. A normal habitation area
2. A seasonal habitation area
3. A pottery production area
4. A spring site
5. A clay source
6. A "ceremonial" area

Williams discounts the first five hypotheses and supports the last one based on his research.

The ceremony that occurred at the site is still debated. There were no human remains or cremations found at the site. However, Williams proposes hypotheses. Although the people of the site were Hitchiti, they shared a lot of similar traditions with the Cherokee. The site, being between water (Riley Shoals and the Oconee River), would have drawn in Cherokee-like ceremonies for two reasons—the plentiful food around water and the wariness the people had of rivers. This could have been a site where people would gather and teach the next generation the dangers of the shoals and rivers.

Another applicable Cherokee tradition would have been sweat baths. Ceremonial sweat baths was considered a medical cure to diseases. Additionally, by "going into water," Cherokee considered this to be a religious experience in itself. The Punk Rock Shelter could have easily been a site for sweat baths. The water-worn and red pebbles could have been used to heat up the bath. There would only be a need for a few skins to keep the steam in the shelter. The large rocks could have been seats for people or had fires built around the bases heating them. The pottery vessels could hold hot water, and the Oconee River is conveniently there for people to jump in and cool-off.

== See also ==
- List of Mississippian sites
