= Beaverdam Creek Archaeological Site =

Archaeological site in Georgia, United States of America

- Location within Georgia
- 34°4′50.66″N 82°39′50.29″W
- Cultures: South Appalachian Mississippian culture
- Location: Elbert County, Georgia, USA
- Region: Elbert County, Georgia

History
- Built: 1200 CE
- Abandoned: 1500 CE

Site notes
- Architectural style: platform mound

The Beaverdam Creek Archaeological Site, (9 EB 85), is an archaeological site located on a floodplain of Beaverdam Creek in Elbert County, Georgia approximately 0.8 km from the creek's confluence with the Savannah River, and is currently inundated by the Richard B. Russell Lake. The site consisted of a platform mound and an associated village site.

Beaverdam Creek is thought to have been the center of a Mississippian culture simple chiefdom with a small resident population. The primary period of mound construction and village occupation dated to the regional Savannah period of the Middle Mississippian period, specifically 1200–1300 CE, with the site's abandonment occurring sometime after 1300. The mound was 1.5 metres (4.9 ft) high, and its base measured 25 metres (82 ft) by 25 metres (82 ft). The village boundaries were delineated as 15,000 square meters.

== Excavation ==
- 1969: The site was first observed professionally by Brooks Hutto, who reported that at least two decades of sustained looting by pot-hunters had damaged the mound and village site considerably.
- 1971: Joseph R. Caldwell of the University of Georgia conducted an eight-week field-school at the site, but a series of unpredictable and unfortunate events, including dismal weather, pot-hunting raids by looters, and the theft of equipment resulted in a disappointing excavation season.
- 1973: Chung Ho Lee, following the death of Joseph R. Caldwell, wrote a report summarizing the 1971 excavations. Lee concluded that the mound was a multi-stage platform mound constructed during the Savannah period, and that ceremonial grave goods (including a copper-covered celt) were included in the mound.
- 1977: The Institute of Archaeology and Anthropology of the University of South Carolina conducted survey and testing that indicated a village midden was present and extended some 50 metres (160 ft) from the mound.
- 1979: At the behest of the U.S. Army Corps of Engineers, the Thunderbird Research Corporation undertook to more accurately delineate the village boundaries through shovel tests, augering and limited excavation.
- 1980: Excavations by Gardner and Rappleye revealed early Lamar period (1375–1475 CE) material in the midden. They proposed this as the primary use period for the site. Because this conflicted with Caldwell's conclusions, they recommended to the U.S. Army Corps of Engineers that the mound be completely excavated, the village midden be extensively tested, and that the floodplain to the north and southeast be thoroughly surveyed.
- 1980-1981: With funds provided by the U.S. Army Corps of Engineers, the University of Georgia Research Foundation, and the Archaeological Services Branch of the National Park Service began excavations as mitigation under Section 106 of the National Historic Preservation Act for the construction of the Richard B. Russell Dam and Reservoir. These excavations were led by David J. Hally and James C. Rudolph, and generated copious amounts of information concerning mound construction stages, subsistence, and social structure, as well as evidence for cooking, tool making, trash disposal, and one possible village structure.

== Site description ==
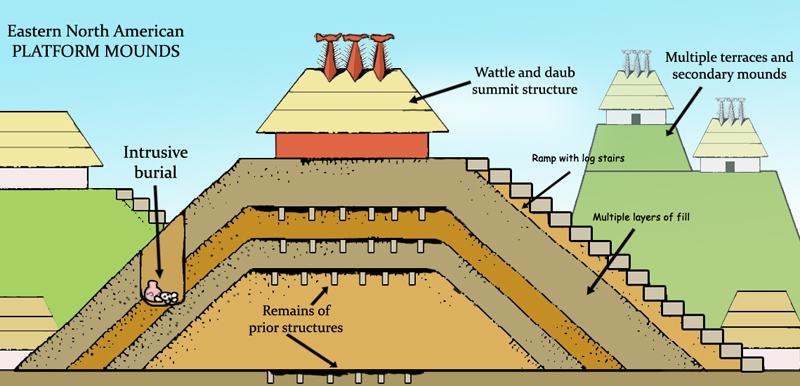
A diagram showing the various components of mound growth for a platform mound

The mound construction stages show a growing complexity in social structure and hierarchy at the site. Beginning as a midden 15–20 cm thick, the mound developed through a succession of two earthlodge structures, a possible flooding event, and four subsequent mound building stages. The earthlodges were superimposed square structures surrounded by significantly high earthen embankments. The interment of a high-status individual, known as Burial 2, occurred prior to the construction of the second earthlodge and after the partial dismantling of the first. These structures were covered by a layer of water-lain sand that is interpreted as a possible flooding event. Following this, four separate platform-mound building events were recorded by Hally and Rudolph. The mounds were topped by free-standing structures of possible political/ceremonial importance. During Mound Stage 2 a 2.25 metres (7.4 ft) wide ramp was added; it appeared to have steps.

There were 46 burials (16 adult females, 15 adult males, 13 children and 3 of indeterminate sex) excavated by Hally and Rudolph that exhibit marked differentiation of social status. Burial 2 was replete with grave goods. The inclusion of children into mound mortuary has been interpreted as evidence for ascribed status, and is considered a marker of increased hierarchical differentiation. Burial 2 grave goods included more than 7,000 mussel shell beads and a copper headpiece and ear spools.

The well-preserved food remains excavated from village midden provides for a detailing of a diversified and generalized subsistence strategy rather that a more focal strategy employed by the inhabitants. The remains included resources from the upland and bottomland forest, river shoals, and agricultural practices on the fertile floodplain, and included maize, squash, sumpweed, sunflower, maypops, grapes, persimmons, acorns, hickory nuts, grass seeds and greens as floral resources, as well, as faunal resources such as deer, rabbits, squirrels, raccoons, beaver, turkey and riverine foods including turtle, catfish, gar, sucker and bass.

The excavations conducted at Beaverdam Creek have helped to clarify two important categories of study in Mississippian-period chiefdoms; namely, how a chiefdom is quantified and what subsistence strategies were employed by a chiefdom once it has been quantified. Researchers argue that the exchange of earthlodges for structures atop platform mounds, coupled with Burial 2 and the inclusion of children, demonstrate the emergence of the site as a stratified chiefdom. The floral and faunal evidence indicate a highly diversified subsistence strategy.

== Inundation ==
The Richard B. Russell Dam constructed on the Savannah River inundated site 9EB85 as the filling of the Richard B. Russell Reservoir began in October 1983.

== See also ==
- List of Mississippian sites
