= Riverview Mounds Archaeological Site =

Archaeological site in Tennessee, U.S.

- Location within Tennessee
- 36°27′11.12″N 87°17′49.99″W
- Cultures: Mississippian culture
- Location: Montgomery County, Tennessee, USA
- Region: Montgomery County, Tennessee

History
- Built: 1000 CE
- Abandoned: 1500 CE

Site notes
- Architectural style: platform mound

Riverview Mounds Archaeological Site (40MT44), also known as the Rinehart Acres, is an archaeological site of the Mississippian culture located south of Clarksville in Montgomery County, Tennessee, on the eastern shore of the Cumberland River. The site was inhabited from approximately 1000 to 1500 CE.

The site was a multi-mound complex with two platform mounds and associated cemetery and village areas. Although not a large site, it is important for its informational value because of its preservation. Many other Mississippian mound complexes in Middle Tennessee have been destroyed by urban development and several centuries of European farming methods or have been heavily looted by pothunters. The site was added to the National Register of Historic Places on March 4, 2009. The site is currently part of the "RiverView Mounds Family Fun Farm" and is available for public viewing and tours.

== See also ==
- Obion Mounds
- List of Mississippian sites
