= Fewkes Group Archaeological Site =

Archaeological site in Tennessee

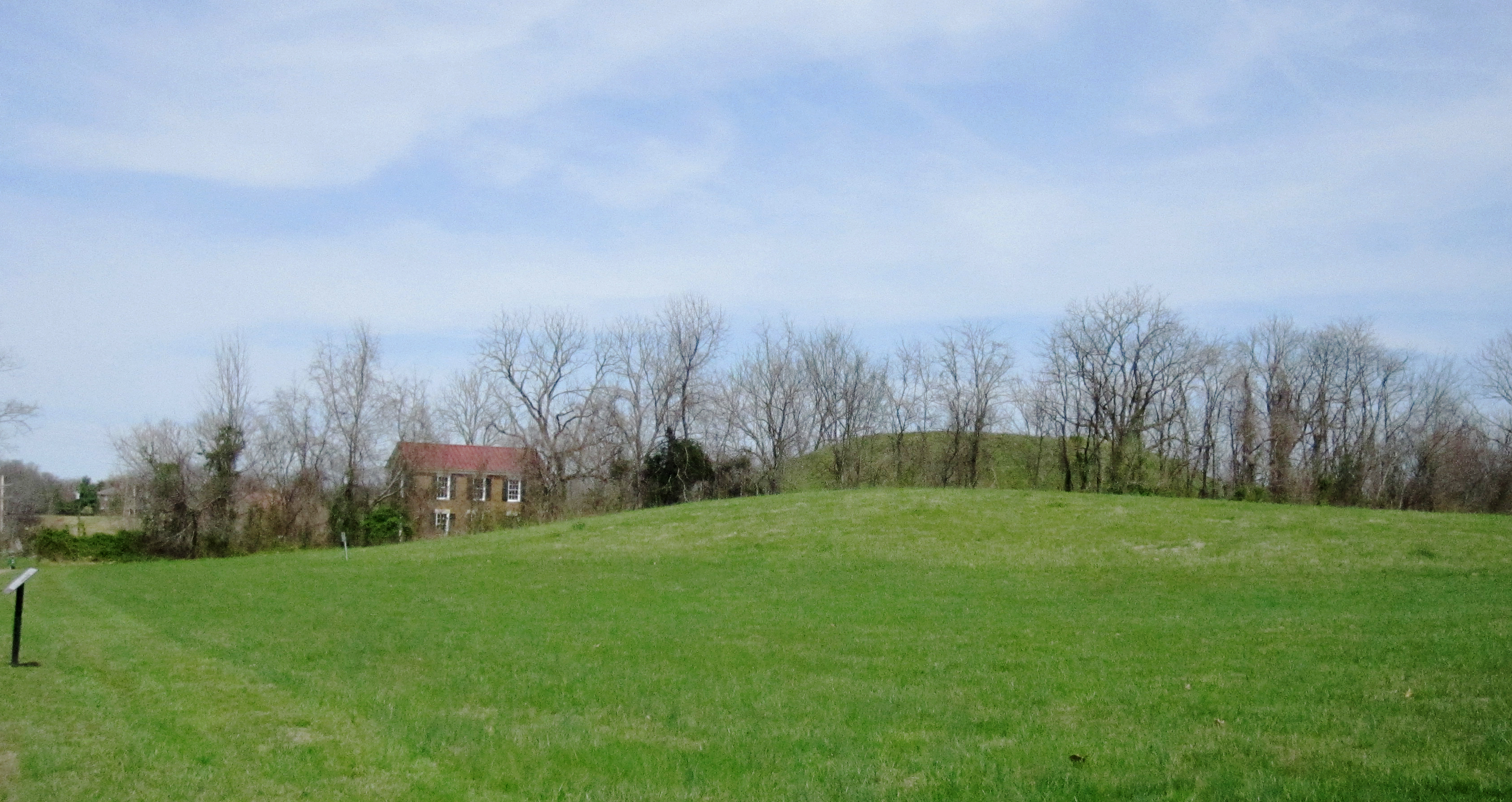
- Fewkes Mounds No. 1 & 2. Boiling Spring Academy in the background

- Location within Tennessee today
- 35°58′0.44″N 86°46′34.54″W
- Cultures: Mississippian culture
- Location: Williamson County, Tennessee, USA
- Region: Williamson County, Tennessee

History
- Built: 1050
- Abandoned: 1475

Site notes
- Architectural styles: burial mounds, platform mounds, plaza
- Excavation dates: 1920
- Archaeologists: William E. Myer
- Responsible body: City of Brentwood

Fewkes Group Archaeological Site (40 WM 1), also known as the Boiling Springs Site, is a pre American history Native American archaeological site located in the city of Brentwood, in Williamson County, Tennessee. It is in Primm Historic Park on the grounds of Boiling Spring Academy, a historic schoolhouse established in 1830. The 15-acre site consists of the remains of a late Mississippian culture mound complex and village roughly dating to 1050-1475 AD. The site, which sits on the western bank of the Little Harpeth River, has five mounds, some used for burial and others, including the largest, were ceremonial platform mounds. The village was abandoned for unknown reasons around 1450. The site is named in honor of Dr. J. Walter Fewkes, the Chief of the Bureau of American Ethnology in 1920, who had visited the site and recognized its potential. While it was partially excavated by the landowner in 1895, archaeologist William E. Myer directed a second, more thorough excavation in October 1920. The report of his findings was published in the Bureau of American Ethnology's Forty-First Annual Report. Many of the artifacts recovered from the site are now housed at the Smithsonian Institution. It was added to the National Register of Historic Places on April 21, 1980, as NRIS number 80003880.

== Inhabitants ==
Two different groups of people lived at the Fewkes Site. The first group, who built the mounds and left the majority of artifacts, buried their dead with their bodies tightly flexed in hexagonal and circular stone box graves. This was probably achieved by tightly binding the body after death, because the bones appear to be in their proper places. These people appear to have lived in circular houses. This occupation dates to the Mississippian period, between 1000 – 1450. A second group moved into the area toward the end of the period. This group buried its dead with the bodies fully extended, on their backs, in rectangular stone box graves. Archaeological research done within the Middle Cumberland River Valley marks a virtual abandonment of the area around 1450. It is unknown what caused this, but the large amount of broken pottery on the floors of their homes may indicate that they were forced to leave in a hurry. This abandonment of the region is part of a larger pattern seen in parts of the Ohio, Mississippi, Tennessee, and Cumberland River valleys known as the "Vacant Quarter" hypothesis. As of 2010, officials at the Tennessee Department of Environment and Conservation, Division of Archaeology, have been unable to identify modern tribal descendants of the inhabitants of the site.

== Site description ==
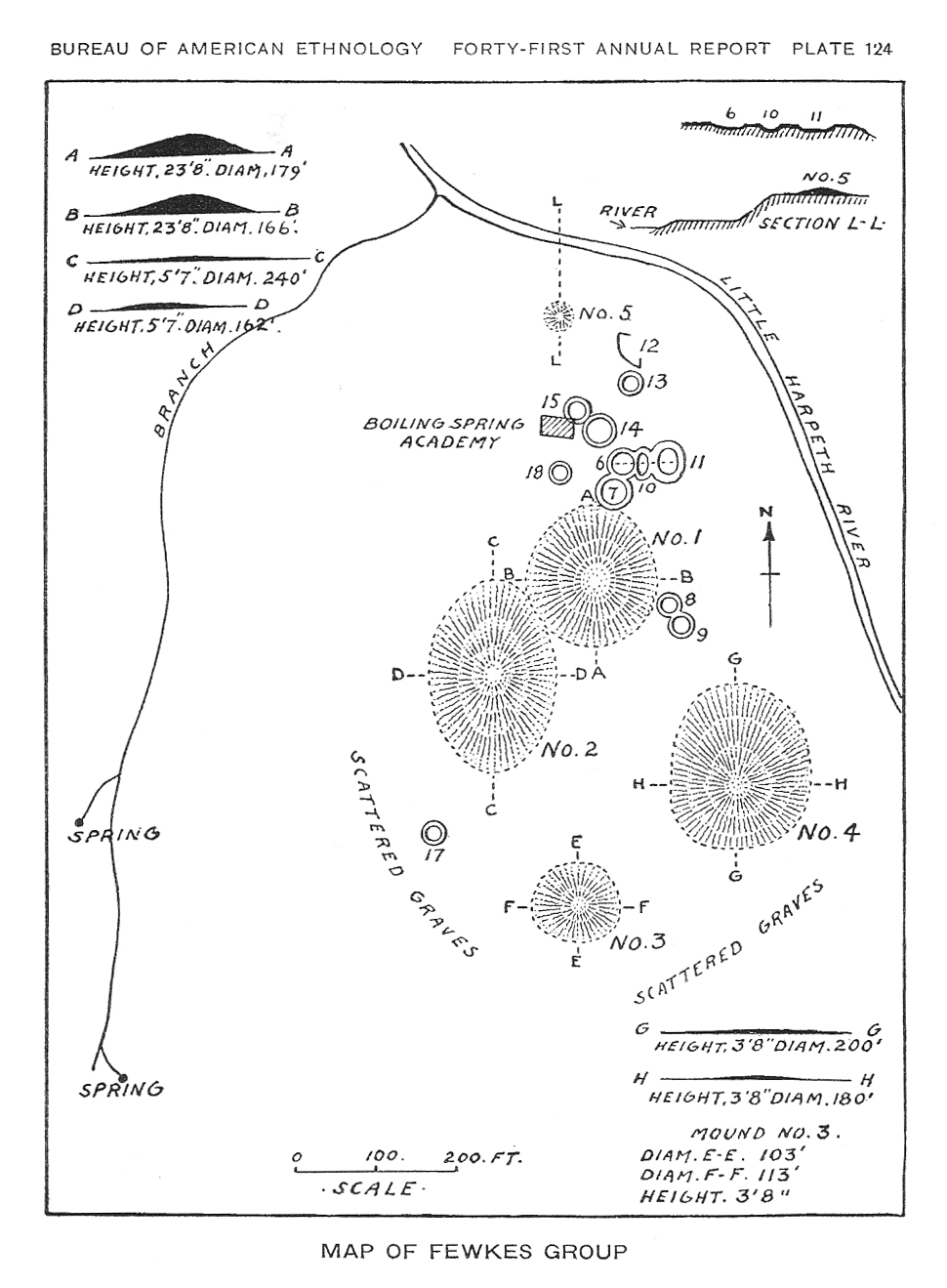
1920 Map of Fewkes Group

There are five mounds at the Fewkes site. Four of them are located opposite of each other on each side of a level town plaza, and the fifth (smallest) mound is situated on the riverbank directly to the north of mound No. 1, outside the town center. (Looking at the site today, the Boiling Spring Schoolhouse now sits between mound No.1 and mound No. 5). Mound No. 1 is the largest at the site, being 25 feet (7.6 m) in height. Remnants of about a dozen house circles were found scattered around the outer edges of the group of mounds, mostly between mounds No.1 and No. 5. The most important houses adjoined mound No. 1 on the northeast side. These are represented on the 1920 map by circles. Traces of a stone box cemetery were also found on the property, not far from the mound complex.

=== Mound No. 1 ===
Mound No. 1 is the largest mound at the complex and is located on the northern side of the town square. The platform mound is 25 feet (7.6 m) and measures 185 feet (56 m) by 160 feet (49 m) across. It was left unexcavated in 1920 because of a lack of funding, although archaeologist William Myer believed its use to be ceremonial, and possibly the location of a chief's residence.

=== Mound No. 2 ===
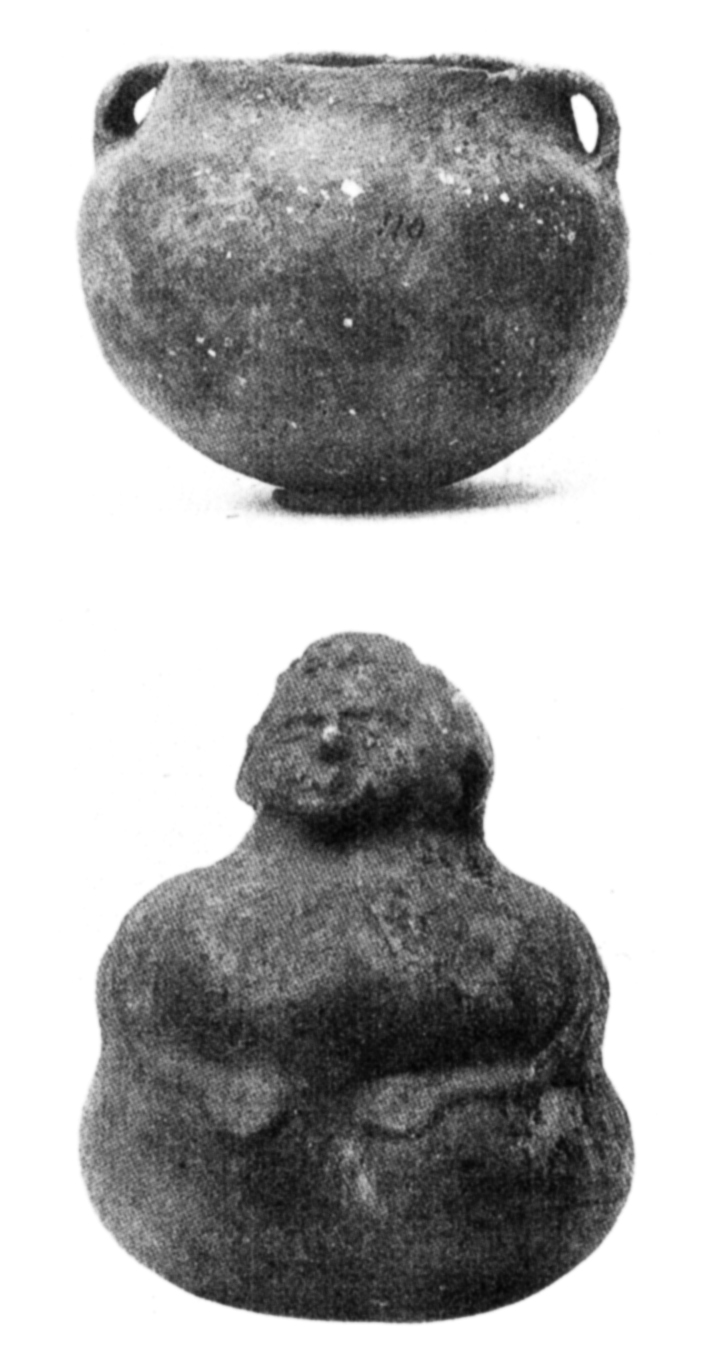
Pottery found in Mound No. 2, in the 1920 excavation

Mound No. 2 is located on the western side of the plaza. It is 235 feet (72 m) across from north to south, and 160 feet (49 m) across east to west. At the time of excavation it reached 7.5 feet (2.3 m) high. Less than one-fifth of the area of the mound was excavated; because of this, it is impossible to know the number of structures constructed upon it. The mound was raised in four stages. The first level, at the base of the mound, was the original ground surface of the soil. In this layer, archaeologists discovered a fire bed filled with ashes and broken animal bones, indicating that a structure had existed there before the mound was built over top of it. After the house was torn down, the 3 feet (0.91 m) high mound was constructed in its place. On the second level there is evidence that at least one building, and probably more, were constructed. The floor of this structure was packed down and layered with stone slabs, much like pavement. A small pile of maize and maize meal were also found. In the southwestern segment of the mound were found the ruins of a structure, named by Myer the "Sacred Image House" because among the items found were the remains of a sacred idol, a shrine, and traces of fire ceremonies. After the buildings were torn down the mound was raised a few more inches for the third construction level. Many items were found on this level, such as a metate and muller, arrowheads, shell tempered pottery, multiple fire beds, and objects made from deer bones. However, the most important was a structure dubbed the "House of Mysteries". The building was an important civic structure, probably used for sacred rites and town gatherings, and had two rooms. Myers described the floor as being made of "black, glossy earth". The walls and roof of the building were built using the cane matting technique and an arched roof. The woven cane matting was then covered inside and outside with a coating of clay plaster known as wattle and daub. Inside the building was an altar, complete with an oval altar bowl. The bowl, filled with white, powdery ashes, was made of fired red clay. The fire was allowed to burn without being put out. The structure was eventually destroyed by fire. Mound No. 2 was in constant cultivation for at least 85 years, and as a result, only limited structural evidence exists for the final stage. However, numerous postholes indicate that there was a building constructed atop the mound during this phase. It is also important to note that a few burials from the later group of rectangular stone grave people were found close to the surface of Mound No. 2. These were discovered in 1895, when the farmer who owned the land plowed over them and decided to take a closer look.

=== Mound No. 3 ===
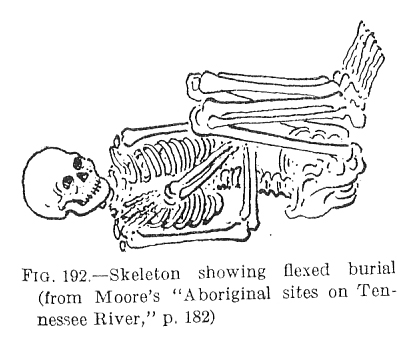
Stone box grave demonstrating flexed burial

Mound No. 3 is a burial mound of the first inhabitants of the Fewkes group. It is a low oval mound on the southwestern corner of the plaza. The mound is about 3 feet (0.91 m) high and 100 feet (30 m) by 110 feet (34 m) across, but slopes very gradually into the soil, so it is impossible to determine its exact boundaries. Originally, it probably held 10-15 graves, but unfortunately all except two have been destroyed by looters and plowing. These two graves were very different from the usual method of burial during the Mississippian period in the Middle Tennessee region. Typically, the deceased were buried on their backs with their legs fully extended, as in a modern-day burial. The remains found in the two graves from this mound had been buried on their backs with their bodies tightly flexed. Their stone-slab graves were octagonal, hexagonal, or nearly round. When the first grave was opened, the slabs on top were missing and the bones had been slightly disturbed, probably by looters. It was octagonal and made from limestone slabs. Grave goods found with the deceased included five large shell beads and a clay pot. The second grave was similar in size to the first, but it was hexagonal. As with the first grave, it had been disturbed by looters and the body was slightly repositioned. The grave goods found with the second set of remains included a small effigy burial vase (somehow overlooked by the looters) and a mussel shell, which was most likely a spoon.

=== Mound No. 4 ===
Mound No. 4 is located on the east side of the plaza. It is low and oblong, about 4 feet (1.2 m) high, and 200 feet (61 m) by 180 feet (55 m) across. No evidence of fire pits, pottery, or graves were discovered. William Myer believed it to be a natural knoll in the field, given its shape by the removal of soil used for the construction of Mound No. 1. Erosion and years of cultivation have destroyed any evidence of possible of associated structures atop the mound.

=== Mound No. 5 ===
Mound No. 5 is a small oval mound 32 feet (9.8 m) across and 3.5 feet (1.1 m) high. It is located about 300 feet (91 m) north of Boiling Spring Academy overlooking the bank of the Little Harpeth River. There was no evidence of buildings or burials in this mound, although broken animal bones and pottery fragments were found scattered throughout the soil. Traces of a fire pit and two bone tools were also found.

=== Structures ===
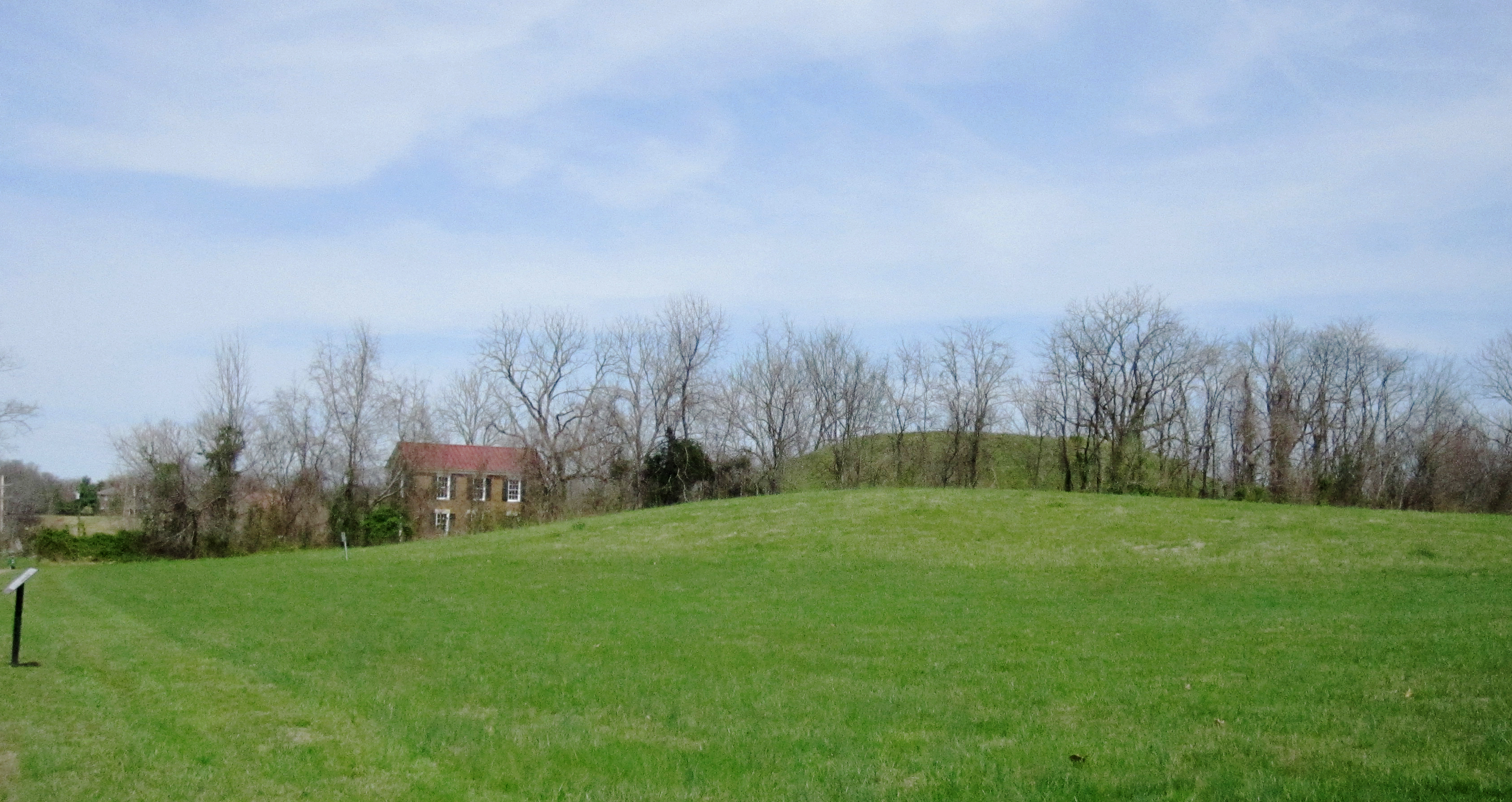
Original image of child buried against the fire basin found during a house excavation at Fewkes was removed due to a standing request by Native American tribal members as to not have images of ancestral remains on display to the public.

Many saucer-like depressions were discovered around the north side of Mound No. 1 and in an adjoining field that are thought to be the remains of domestic structures. There is also a large number of these depressions to the west of Mound No. 2 and Mound No. 3. These buildings appear to have been made similarly to the ceremonial buildings found on top of the mounds, with cane matting and plastered walls. Objects found in and around these depressions include bear teeth, arrowheads, broken animal bones, traces of plastered walls, stone disks, and a store of yellow ochre that was most likely used as body paint.

Upon excavation, one circular depression was found to be a nearly smooth, level, hard-packed floor. In the center of this structure was an upright, stone-slab fire basin, one side of which had been cut out; this was to allow room for the upright stone slab of a child's grave. The child, thought to be about 12 years old, was found buried against the slab, with its head resting within the edges of the bowl. Ashes remained in the bowl and also along the back and top of the child's head, although the bones do not appear to have been burned at all. Graves of two other children, whose stone box graves were also found in and below the floor.

=== Other burials ===
Two burials were found about 100 feet (30 m) southeast of Mound No. 3. The first was a woman whose body was loosely flexed on her right side. There were no grave goods found. The second burial, located on the woman's right, was simply a pile of bones. There were no grave goods or stone box coffin found in the burial. It is not known if this person had a connection with the deceased woman. Other burials were discovered scattered around the site, from the later group of people who inhabited the area. Grave goods for these burials included conch shells, pottery, spearheads, playing dice crafted from deer bones, and a black stone female statuette.

== Excavations in 1998 ==
The remains of at least 21 individuals, along with their funerary objects, were removed from the Fewkes group site during a road construction project by the Tennessee Department of Transportation in 1998. Grave goods removed included ceramic ear plugs, effigy jars, projectile points, a drilled dog tooth and a bone awl. As of April 23, 2010, efforts are being made to reinter the culturally unidentifiable remains from the Fewkes site.

== See also ==
- Old Town Archaeological Site (40 WM 2)
- List of Mississippian sites
