= Taskigi Mound =

Historic site in Alabama, United States

- Mound at Fort Toulouse – Fort Jackson Park, Pakana
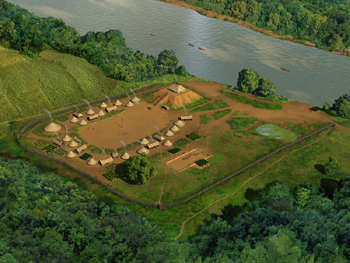
- Artist's conception of the Taskigi Site

- Location in Alabama today
- 32.50400°N 86.25810°W
- Cultures: South Appalachian Mississippian culture
- Location: Elmore County, Alabama, USA
- Region: Central Alabama

The Taskigi Mound or Mound at Fort Toulouse – Fort Jackson Park (1EE1) is an archaeological site from the South Appalachian Mississippian Big Eddy phase. It is located on a 40 feet (12 m) bluff at the confluence of the Coosa and Tallapoosa rivers where they meet to form the Alabama River, near the town of Wetumpka in Elmore County, Alabama.

== Description ==
The mound and village area were constructed during the prehistoric Mississippian culture period. The site features include a village with a central plaza area, a rectangular platform mound, the borrow pit where the fill for the mound was quarried, and a surrounding wooden palisade.

== History ==
The pottery of the Big Eddy phase (1450 - 1560) is related to the pottery of the Moundville III phase (1450-1550 CE) of the large polity centered around the Moundville Archaeological Site located to the northwest of Tuskigi on the Black Warrior River. Moundville was being abandoned during this period and the Big Eddy phase people are thought to be intrusive to the Coosa River area, and had originated at Moundville. The Big Eddy phase has been tentatively identified as the protohistoric Province of Tuskaloosa encountered by the Hernando de Soto expedition in 1540, located downriver from the Coosa province.

The site was occupied in the historic period by the Alabama and Muscogee (Creek) villages, named respectively Pakana and Taskigi, from which the site takes its name. It is unknown what the original inhabitants and builders of the mound called the site.

== Preservation ==
The site is preserved as part of the Fort Toulouse-Fort Jackson State Historic Site and is one of the locations included on the University of Alabama Museums "Alabama Indigenous Mound Trail".

== See also ==
- Bottle Creek Mounds
- Jere Shine site
- King site
