= Rowlandton Mound Site =

Archaeological site in Kentucky, US

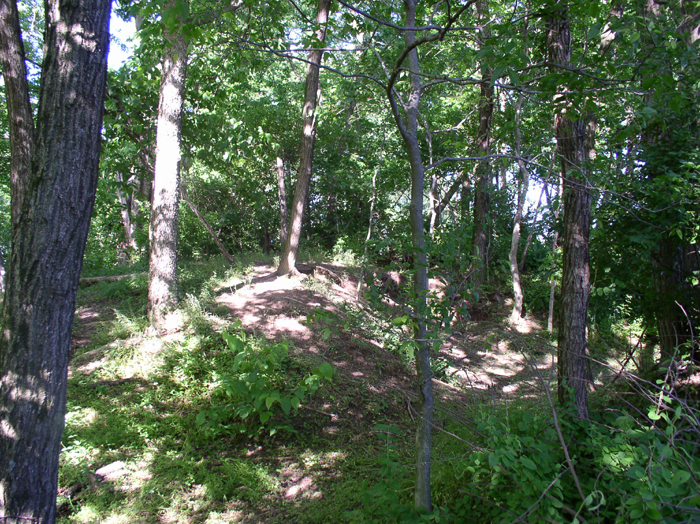
- Rowlandtown Mound with pit dug by archaeologists

- Location within Kentucky today
- 37°5′42.07″N 88°38′11.29″W
- Cultures: Mississippian culture
- Location: Paducah, Kentucky, McCracken County, Kentucky, USA
- Region: Jackson Purchase

History
- Built: 1100 CE
- Abandoned: 1350 CE

Site notes
- Architectural style: Platform mound
- Excavation dates: 2006
- Archaeologists: Dr. Kit Wesler

The Rowlandton Mound Site (15MCN3) is a Mississippian culture archaeological site located in Paducah in McCracken County, Kentucky, on the edge of an old oxbow lake a little south of the Ohio River.

== Site description ==
The site was occupied from about 1100 to about 1350 CE. The 3 hectares (7.4 acres) site has a large platform mound and an associated village area, being roughly similar in size to the Wickliffe Mounds Site in far western Kentucky.

It was once thought that large civic sites in Western Kentucky such as Rowlandton Mound, the Twin Mounds Site and the Tolu Site were expansions of the Kincaid Mounds polity in nearby Southern Illinois in the 13th century, but archaeological excavations in 2006 by Dr. Kit Wesler of Murray State University have shown that this was not the case. It is probable that these civic sites were established originally by local Late Woodland peoples.
