= Hoojah Branch Site =

Archaeological site in Georgia, U.S.

- Cultures: South Appalachian Mississippian culture
- Location: Dillard, Rabun County, Georgia, USA
- Region: Rabun County, Georgia

Site notes
- Architectural style: platform mound
- Hoojah Branch Site
- U.S. National Register of Historic Places
- NRHP reference No.: 86003667
- Added to NRHP: January 24, 1987

The Hoojah Branch Site (9RA34) is an archaeological site in Rabun County, Georgia that had periods of occupation from the Archaic period to the Mississippian period. It is believed to be a platform mound similar to others across North Georgia (including the famous Etowah Indian Mounds) built by peoples of the South Appalachian Mississippian culture (a regional variation of the Mississippian culture) that flourished in the Southeastern United States from approximately the years 1000 to 1600. The site is located about one mile east of Dillard, Georgia and is in the Chattahoochee National Forest and may have had a connection to the Qualla mound complexes in southwestern North Carolina. The site was listed on the National Register of Historic Places on January 24, 1973 as reference number 86003667
