= King Archaeological Site =

Archaeological site in Georgia, US

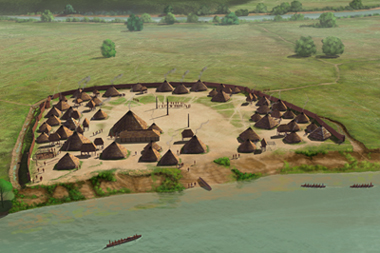
- Artist's conception of the King Site

- Location within Georgia today
- 34°11′53.3″N 85°23′48.19″W
- Periods: Barnett Phase
- Cultures: South Appalachian Mississippian culture
- Location: Rome, Georgia, Floyd County, Georgia, USA
- Region: Floyd County, Georgia

History
- Built: Early sixteenth century
- Abandoned: Late sixteenth century

Site notes
- Architectural styles: village, plaza, council house
- Excavation dates: 1992, 1993
- Archaeologists: David Hally

The King Archaeological Site (9FL5) is a protohistoric Native American archaeological site located on the Coosa River in Floyd County, Georgia. It is one of 5 large contemporaneous village sites located in a 20 kilometres (12 mi) section of the river. The site was a satellite village associated with the Coosa chiefdom centered on the Little Egypt Site located upstream.

== Site description ==
The site is a 5 acres (0.020 km^{2}) village located on the eastern bank of the Coosa River at Foster Bend and dating from the mid-sixteenth century. The village is basically square in layout (149 metres (489 ft) in length on each side) and surrounded by a ditch and palisade on three sides and the Coosa River to the north. At the center of the town was a large plaza, at the center of which was a post measuring almost 1 metre (3.3 ft) in diameter at its base and probably 6 metres (20 ft) to 10 metres (33 ft) high. In between the plaza and the encircling palisade was a village area, with approximately 47 houses and a number of elevated maize storage facilities.

The house structures were rectangular with rounded corners and dugout basin floors. These houses were built using single set-post constructions covered in wattle and daub. They probably had peaked, thatched roofs and averaged about 60 square metres (650 sq ft) in area. The floors were dug into the ground 30 centimetres (12 in) to 50 centimetres (20 in), and the earth removed from the holes was piled onto the outside walls of the house. The insides of the houses had four roof-support posts set in a central square. Smaller interior walls of wattle and daub walls separated the interior areas beyond the central square into work, storage and sleeping areas.

The entrance to these structures had low embanked walls, possibly designed to keep water, dirt and debris from washing into the dugout floors during rainy periods. The elevated corn cribs stood 2 metres (6.6 ft) or so above ground level and would have been used to store food stuffs; they also created shaded areas for activities during the hot summer months. These two types of structures may represent summer and winter habitations, a situation known from ethnographic sources from the Southeast.

Often two or three winter houses and their accompanying summer open-air structures were arranged around a central courtyard area, indicating a larger household unit and possibly depicting an extended family situation. This arrangement was similar to the larger pattern of plaza and village layout.

Located inside the northeast quadrant of the plaza area (separated from the village area) were two special-use structures, probably used as public buildings. The first, labeled structure #17 by archaeologists, was square structure which measured 15 metres (49 ft) on its sides and had benches inside. The remains of ten adult males were found buried beneath the floor of this structure. It was a probably a meeting or council house. The second, labeled structure #16, is smaller. Archaeologists have so far been unable to determine its exact function. Archaeologists estimate that between 277 and 517 people lived in the village.

As the site was inhabited for 50 years or less, no monumental platform mounds were constructed there. If occupation had lasted longer, succeeding generations of inhabitants may have erected these kinds of structures over the council house or structure #16, as was the pattern in many larger Mississippian culture sites occupied for longer periods of time.

== Site history ==
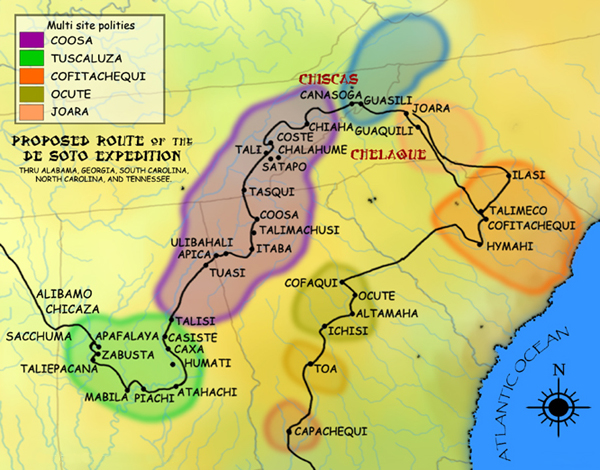
Proposed de Soto expedition route through Georgia

The site was first inhabited during the first half of the sixteenth century when a half a dozen or so domestic structures were raised at the site. Over the next ten years as the town grew, the people delineated a defensive perimeter, plaza, and habitation zone. The site seems to have had a definite layout from its inception, a pattern followed by other similar settlements in the area. After about another 20 or 30 years the town was abandoned.

During this time period, the Hernando de Soto (1540) and the Tristan de Luna (1560) expeditions visited the area, and it is extremely likely that one of the expeditions visited the site. Many items of European manufacture, such as iron tools, were found during excavations of the site. It is not known for sure if the Spaniards were the reason for the site's abandonment. Examination of the numerous graves found at the site provided evidence that an epidemic had the struck the population, although views on this in the archaeological community are divided.

== Excavations ==
The site was excavated in 1974, 1992 and 1993 by David Hally of the University of Georgia and Patrick Garrow of Shorter University in Rome, Georgia.

== See also ==
- Coosa chiefdom
- List of Mississippian sites
