= Avery site =

Archaeological site in Georgia, US

- Periods: Lamar phase
- Cultures: South Appalachian Mississippian culture
- Location: West Point, Georgia, Troup County, Georgia, USA
- Region: Troup County, Georgia

Site notes
- Architectural style: platform mound
- Excavation dates: 1966, 1967, 1968

The Avery site (9TP64) was an archaeological site, now destroyed, located in Troup County, Georgia east of the Chattahoochee River. Early investigations at the site began in 1966 by Harold Huscher, which led to a larger excavation in June 1967, and again in 1968. According to Huscher, the Avery Site is most definitely related to the Georgia Fall Line sites. The site once had two platform mounds, the Avery Mound, the northernmost of the two, was eroded by cultivation and weathering, however enough remained to give evidence to multiple periods of mound rebuilding. 300 feet (91 m) to the south was the Potts Mound, yet while it was bulldozed for field leveling there was still outlining evidence of the mounds former existence.

Surrounding the two mounds was a large village area, dispersed with various pottery remains that point to a late Lamar phase component and even a possible unidentified Mississippian component. A 300 feet (91 m) palisade line was found running along one side of the Avery Mound which exhibits a carefully constructed fortification structure. A curvilinear line of post-holes was discovered surrounding a charcoal-like core mound inside the Avery Mound. Additionally, a large burned rectangular building, with evidence of an octagonal roofing frame, was found at the north margin of the Avery Mound.

This was the extent of the excavation done at the Avery site, even though Huscher believed more should be done on the charcoal-like core mound and palisade.
