= Jere Shine site =

Archaeological site in Alabama, United States

Jere Shine Site
- Cultures: South Appalachian Mississippian culture
- Location: Montgomery County, Alabama, United States
- Region: Central Alabama

History
- Built: 1400 CE
- Abandoned: 1550 CE

Site notes
- Architectural style: platform mound
- Jere Shine Site
- U.S. National Register of Historic Places
- Area: 35 acres (14.2 ha)
- NRHP reference No.: 78000507
- Added to NRHP: December 8, 1978

The Jere Shine Site (1MT6) is an archaeological site on the Tallapoosa River near its confluence with the Coosa River in modern Montgomery County, Alabama. Based on comparison of archaeological remains and pottery styles, scholars believe that it was most likely occupied from 1400 to 1550 CE by people of the South Appalachian Mississippian culture (a regional variation of the Mississippian culture).

== Shine I and II phases ==
Jere Shine is the type site for the Shine I phase (?-1400 CE), and the Lamar culture Shine II phase (1400-1550 CE) in the lower Tallapoosa River region. The site was the largest settlement associated with the Shine II phase and is thought by archaeologists to have been the main site of a chiefdom. The Shine II phase has been tentatively identified with the protohistoric Province of Talisi encountered by the Hernando de Soto expedition in 1540.

The 35-acre (14.2 ha) site contains five platform mounds and numerous shell middens. It was added to the National Register of Historic Places on December 8, 1978.

== See also ==
- Moundville site
- Taskigi Mound
