= David Hally =

American archaeologist (born 1940)

David Judson Hally (born April 16, 1940) is an American archaeologist known for his work at several southeastern sites. He retired from the University of Georgia in 2010 and currently resides in Athens, Georgia.

== Early life ==
Hally was born on April 16, 1940, in Natick, Massachusetts. He attended Dartmouth for his undergraduate degree and was one of the first two students at Dartmouth to graduate with a major in anthropology. He then received his master's degree and PhD in anthropology from Harvard University. He wrote his 1972 dissertation on his fieldwork from 1963 to 1964 in the Tensas Basin in northeastern Louisiana.

== Academic career ==
Hally was appointed assistant professor at the University of Georgia in 1967. He worked there on various projects including one of his most important works, the King site, where he worked in 1974 and again from 1992 to 1993. His work most often pertains to Mississippian life in chiefdoms of the southeastern United States and the pottery associated with these chiefdoms. He has multiple publications including Pottery Form and Function in American Antiquity published in 1986, and papers published separately in 1993 and 1996 describing chiefdoms.

== Publications ==
- King: The Social Archaeology of a Late Mississippian Town in Northwestern Georgia. Tuscaloosa: University of Alabama Press, 2008.ISBN 9780817316044 In 167 libraries according to
- (with James L. Rudolph) Mississippi Period Archaeology of the Georgia Piedmont. Athens: University of Georgia, Dept. of Anthropology, 1986
- (with James B Langford) Mississippi Period Archaeology of the Georgia valley and ridge province. Athens: University of Georgia, Dept. of Anthropology, 1988
- Archaeological Investigation of the Potts' Tract Site (9-Mu-103), Carters Dam, Murray County, Georgia. Athens, Ga: Laboratory of Archaeology, University of Georgia, 1970. OCLC 3108401
  - Review, by Christopher S Peebles: American Antiquity, Oct., 1975, vol. 40, no. 4, p. 504
