= Walter B. Jones (geologist) =

American geologist and archaeologist

- Born: 1895; Alabama, United States
- Died: 1977 (aged 81–82); Huntsville, Alabama
- Education: University of Alabama, Johns Hopkins University
- Known for: Moundville Archaeological Site
- Scientific career
- Fields: geologist, archaeologist
- Workplaces: University of Alabama, Alabama Museum of Natural History

Walter Bryan Jones, Ph.D. (1895–1977) was an American geologist and archaeologist. He served as Alabama State Geologist for 34 years and was director of the Alabama Museum of Natural History. Jones undertook the first large-scale, scientific excavation of the Moundville Archaeological Site, and he founded the Jones Museum at Moundville Archaeological Park.

== Early life and education ==
Born in Alabama, Jones earned his Bachelor of Science degree from the University of Alabama and his doctorate from Johns Hopkins University.

== Career ==
Jones and his three brothers, Howard, Edwin, and Raymond, served in World War I and World War II; a fourth brother Carl served in World War II. During World War II, he was stationed in New Guinea and sent anthropological collections back to the Alabama Museum of Natural History. Jones's oldest son, Nelson Bolling Jones, was killed in Germany, April 2, 1945, fighting the German Army, but he lived to see another son, Douglas Epps Jones, become a professor of geology at the University of Alabama. His other son, Warren Phelps Jones, managed an electro-chemical manufacturing plant in Huntsville, until his retirement in 1994.

Jones excavated the Moundville Archaeological Site in Central Alabama, establishing an important Native American burial site and shedding light on its culture. Jones accepted the position of Assistant State Geologist under Eugene Allen Smith in 1924, and served as State Geologist of Alabama and Director of the Alabama Museum of Natural History from 1927 to 1961. He served as Secretary of Conservation, as well as Professor Emeritus, at the University of Alabama, till his death in 1977 in Huntsville, Alabama. Jones was an avid conservationist, hunter, explorer, collector, and photographer, especially of the state of Alabama and the Southeast.

As State Geologist of Alabama, Jones directed research on many topics including economic minerals, surface and groundwater, petroleum, geologic mapping, fossils, caves, and archaeology. He was the first director of the State Oil and Gas Board of Alabama, putting wise regulations into place before the first large discoveries of petroleum were made. He was instrumental in passing the Alabama Antiquities Act, which protects archaeological artifacts from casual excavation. The collections of the Alabama Museum of Natural History (until 1961 an arm of the Geological Survey) were greatly increased under his direction. Walter B. Jones Hall still houses the Geological Survey of Alabama on the University of Alabama campus.
