= Stone box grave =

Method of burial used by Native Americans

Stone box graves were a method of burial used by Native Americans of the Mississippian culture in the Midwestern United States and the Southeastern United States. Their construction was especially common in the Cumberland River Basin, in settlements found around present-day Nashville, Tennessee.

== Construction ==
A stone box grave is a coffin of stone slabs arranged in a rectangular shape, into which a deceased individual was placed. Common materials used for construction of the graves were limestone and shale, both varieties of stone which naturally break into slab-like shapes. The materials for the bottom of the graves often varies. Grave floors were made of stone, pottery, shell, dirt, perishables, or some combination of those materials, while the tops were formed by more slabs of stone. Grave goods were often interred with the deceased and included mortuary pottery, ceramic objects, stone implements such as celts, axes, and arrowheads, figurines, bone beads, dice, and awls, and personal ornaments including marine shell gorgets and freshwater pearls. Regional variations related to the size of the grave, the design (some were built with right angles and some angled inward at the feet). The people of the Middle Tennessee region tended to place bodies in an extended position, while in Eastern Tennessee a flexed position was more often favored.

In some instances small stone boxes were used as a secondary burial, with excarnated bones placed in as a bundle. Some graves have been found to have been reused. The grave would be reopened and the bones of the previous occupant would be disarticulated and shoved to one end or side, so that the new occupant could be placed in the proper position. Instances of double burials have also been found, with two occupants interred simultaneously. This is thought to be a conjugal pairing, as the occupants are usually of the opposite sex from one another. This type of burial seems to have been reserved for adult members of these societies, with few known examples of child or subadult burials in this fashion. Burials for these individuals appeared to have been made under house floors or adjacent to houses.

== Distribution ==
Stone box graves have been found at many different Mississippian sites, from the American Bottom to the Deep South. The practice was especially prominent in the Cumberland River Valley of Kentucky and Tennessee; thousands of such graves have been found during excavations in the Nashville area.

Sites such as Beasley, Mound Bottom, Brick Church Pike, Old Town, Castalian Springs and Sellars Mound all have examples of excavated stone box graves. They have also been found as distant as the Prather Complex sites in the Louisville, Kentucky vicinity, the Pennyroyal Region of Kentucky, the Lower Illinois River Valley, the Little Egypt region of Illinois, in Missouri near St. Louis and the Guntersville Basin area of Northern Alabama.

== In archaeology ==
Since the beginning of archaeological investigations in the region in the late nineteenth century, the graves have been a source of interpreting the prehistoric inhabitants of the area. Some researchers classified the ancient people of the Middle Tennessee area as the "Stone Grave People". Joseph Jones, under the auspices of the Smithsonian Institution, investigated the Middle Tennessee area in the late 19th century. In his 1876 monograph, he accurately describes the native remains (including the known Native American practice of artificial cranial deformation). He also discussed the possible origins of the local populations and their connection to other peoples and regions, such as the Natchez people of the Lower Mississippi Valley. In the 1870s Frederick Ward Putnam of the Peabody Museum also excavated several large platform mounds with stone box graves in the vicinity of Nashville. In his 1877 report Putnam recorded burial placement and grave goods found during his excavations. He speculated on the ancestry, culture, and age of the people who built the earthwork mounds. Putnam concluded that the people of the area were connected with groups from the central Mississippi River Valley.

Gates P. Thruston's 1890 manuscript, which started as a piece on a stone box grave cemetery found in Nashville, was the first comprehensive analysis of artifacts for the state of Tennessee. Thruston's conclusions about the builders of the local mounds and box graves added to the 19th-century myth of the "Moundbuilders", who were believed to be distinct from Native Americans. Thruston concluded that a "superior race" to known historic Native American peoples had built the structures. Clarence Bloomfield Moore conducted a riverboat expedition of 1914–1915 with his Gopher of Philadelphia. He continued the tradition of extensive archaeological research in the area and was also fascinated by the stone box graves. He made maps of sites showing the different varieties of stone graves in Middle Tennessee, the Upper Tennessee Valley, and nearby Northern Alabama regions.

== See also ==
- Cist
- List of Mississippian sites
- Mississippian culture burial mounds
- Southeastern Ceremonial Complex
