= Bottle Creek Indian Mounds =

Archaeological site in Alabama, United States

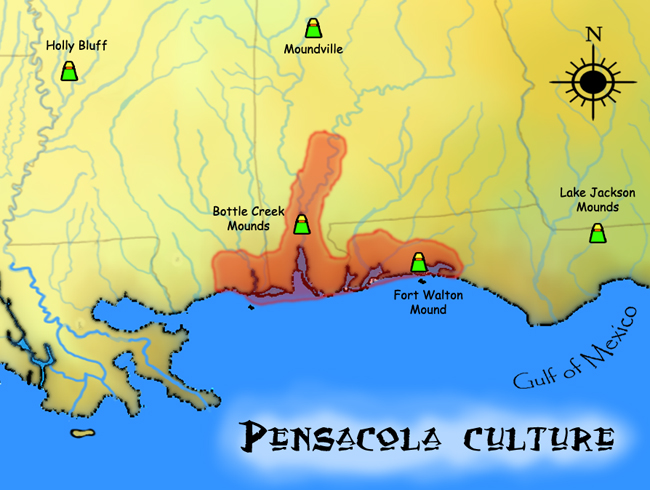
- Bottle Creek Mounds and related Mississippian sites

- Location within Alabama today
- 31°0′31.69″N 87°56′26.04″W
- Cultures: Pensacola culture
- Location: Stockton, Alabama

History
- Built: 1250
- Abandoned: 1550

Site notes
- Architectural style: platform mound
- Excavation dates: 1932
- Archaeologists: David L. DeJarnette
- Bottle Creek Site
- U.S. National Register of Historic Places
- U.S. National Historic Landmark
- NRHP reference No.: 74000398

Significant dates
- Added to NRHP: December 2, 1974
- Designated NHL: April 19, 1994

Bottle Creek Indian Mounds (1BA2) is an archaeological site owned and monitored by the Alabama Historical Commission located on a low swampy island within the Mobile-Tensaw River Delta north of Mobile, Alabama, United States. It was occupied by the peoples of the Pensacola culture, a regional Mississippian culture variant, and is the largest site of the Mississippian culture on the central Gulf Coast. It is important to understanding the history and culture of the Mobile-Tensaw delta in late prehistoric times and was designated as a National Historic Landmark on March 10, 1995, making it one of only two such sites in Alabama (alongside Moundville Archeological Park).

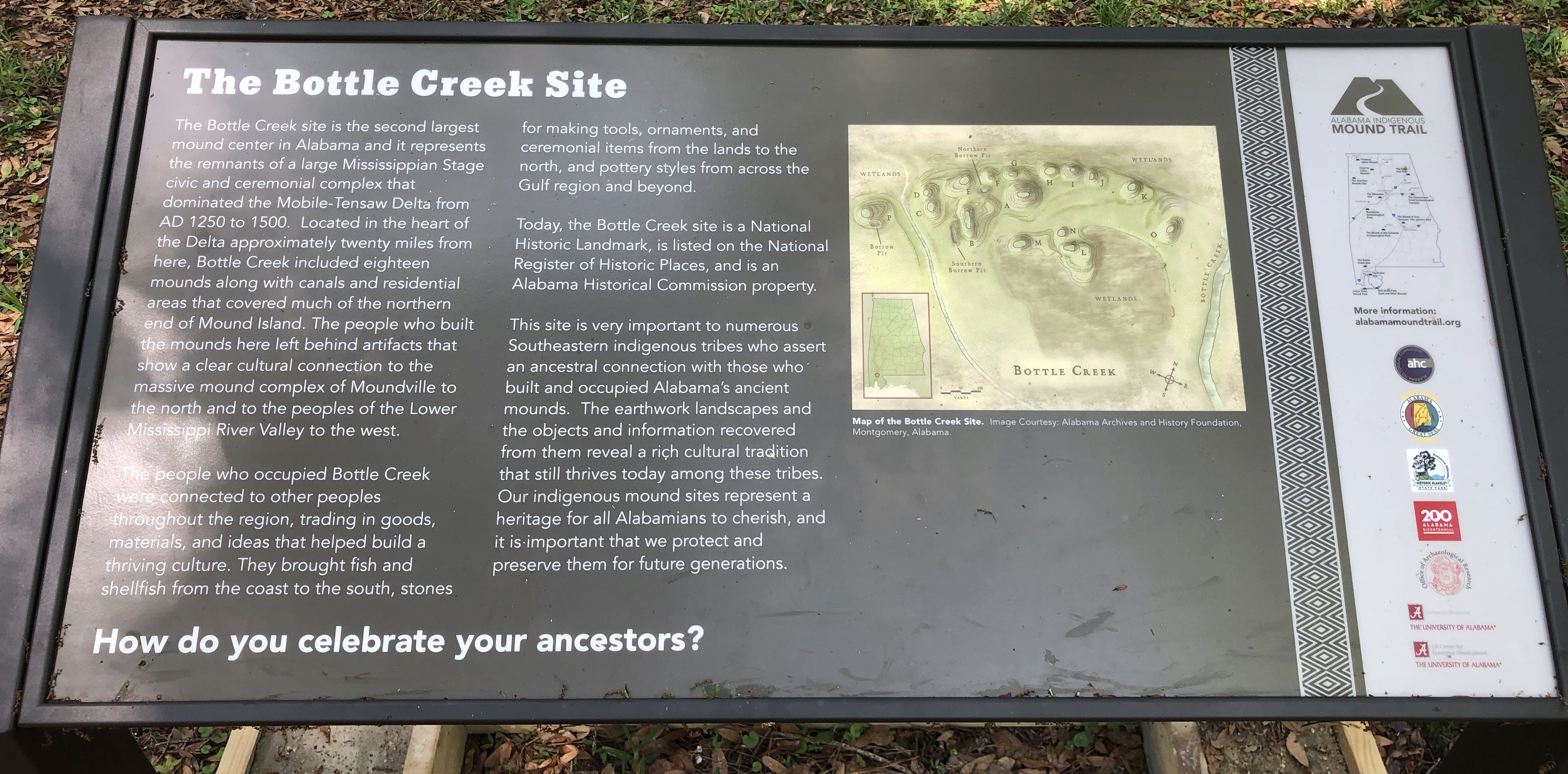
Bottle Creek Site marker at Blakeley State Park

== History ==
The site was occupied between 1250 and 1550, and served as the focal point for interaction with other Mississippian culture areas along the coast and the interior of the Southeastern United States. It is located on Mound Island in the Mobile-Tensaw River Delta, north of present-day Mobile, and includes 18 platform mounds, the tallest being roughly 45 feet (14 m) high. Five of those eighteen mounds are arranged around the central plaza. It was the largest Mississippian chiefdom on the north-central Gulf Coast. It is difficult to reach by foot; however, it would have been easily accessed by dugout canoes, the primary mode of transportation of the peoples in the region. It lies near the confluence of the Tombigbee and Alabama rivers. The streams become a maze of branches and bayous at the head of Mobile Bay. The site was a ceremonial center for the Pensacola people, as well as a social, political, religious, and trade center for the Mobile Delta region and the central Gulf Coast.

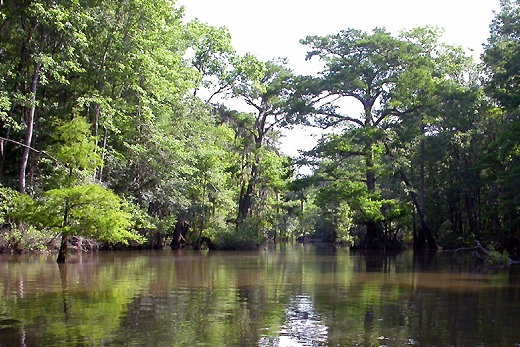
The approach to Mound Island, site is on the left.

Bottle Creek site was first mapped in the 1880s, but its location in the middle of the delta, completely surrounded by swamp and hidden by immense cypress trees, made it inaccessible. This protected it from most of the plundering that occurred at similar sites in the Southeast. It was a ceremonial center for the Pensacola people and served as a gateway to their society despite its seemingly remote location. It was first professionally investigated in 1932 when David L. DeJarnette, of the Alabama Museum of Natural History, began his work there to determine if the site had a cultural relationship with Moundville, connected to the north by a river system. It was listed on the National Register of Historic Places in 1974.

== Access ==
Due to their remote location, the site is only accessible to visitors via watercraft tours that depart from Stockton, Alabama. Tours depart daily and take about 4 hours by boat and 6–8 hours by canoe or kayak. Trips consist of a trip to and from Mound Island and interpretive discussions about the Mississippian culture peoples that lived at Bottle Creek, including their sport, food, culture and a visit to the top of the largest mound.

== See also ==
- List of National Historic Landmarks in Alabama
