= Moundville Archaeological Site =

Archaeological site in Alabama, United States

- U.S. National Register of Historic Places
- U.S. National Historic Landmark
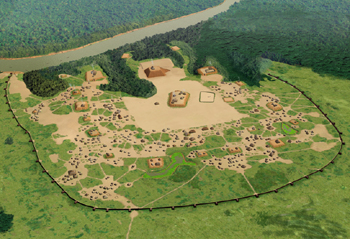
- Artist's conception of the Moundville Archaeological Site

- Location within Alabama Location within the United States
- Location: 634 Mound State Parkway; Moundville, Alabama, US
- Nearest city: Tuscaloosa
- Coordinates: 33.00467°N 87.63107°W
- NRHP reference No.: 66000149

Significant dates
- Added to NRHP: October 15, 1966
- Designated NHL: July 19, 1964

Moundville Archaeological Site, also known as the Moundville Archaeological Park, is a Mississippian culture archaeological site on the Black Warrior River in Hale County, near the modern city of Tuscaloosa, Alabama. Extensive archaeological investigation has shown that the site was the political and ceremonial center of a regionally organized Mississippian culture chiefdom polity known as the Province of Pafalaya between the 11th and 16th centuries. The archaeological park portion of the site is administered by the University of Alabama Museums and encompasses 185 acres (75 ha), consisting of 29 platform mounds around a rectangular plaza.

The site was declared a National Historic Landmark in 1964 and was added to the National Register of Historic Places in 1966.

Moundville is the second-largest site in the United States of the classic Middle Mississippian era, after Cahokia in Illinois. The culture was expressed in villages and chiefdoms throughout the central Mississippi River Valley, the lower Ohio River Valley, and most of the Mid-South area, including Kentucky, Tennessee, Alabama, and Mississippi as the core of the classic Mississippian culture area. The park contains a museum and an archaeological laboratory.

== History ==
Moundville was mentioned by E. G. Squier and Edwin Hamilton Davis in their work, Ancient Monuments of the Mississippi Valley (c1848), a survey conducted for the Smithsonian Institution. Later in the century, Nathaniel Thomas Lupton created a fairly accurate map of the site.

Little excavation work was conducted at Moundville by the Bureau of Ethnology's Division of Mound Exploration, partly because the landowner imposed a fee. The first significant archaeological investigations were not conducted until the early 20th century, by Clarence Bloomfield Moore, a lawyer from Philadelphia. He dug extensively at Moundville in 1906, and his detailed records of his work and finds have been of use to modern archaeologists. But looters dug into the mounds over the next two decades and took many artifacts, in addition to destroying stratigraphy of some structures.

In the mid-1920s concerned citizens, including Walter B. Jones (geologist) (after whom the site's museum is named) had begun a concerted effort to save the site. With the help of the Alabama Museum of Natural History, they purchased the land containing the mounds. By 1933 the site had officially become known as Mound State Park, but the park was not developed for visitors until 1938. During this period of the Great Depression, workers of the Civilian Conservation Corps were brought in to stabilize the mounds against erosion. They also constructed roads and buildings to allow public uses at the site. The name of the park was changed to Mound State Monument and was opened to the public in 1939.

The Jones Archaeological Museum was constructed on the park property in 1939 for display of artifacts collected at the site and interpretation of the ancient peoples and culture. It served as a valuable teaching center for many decades. In the 21st century, the museum was remodeled and equipped with the latest technological improvements in 2010. The University of Alabama maintains an archaeological lab at the park and sponsors summer field seasons and public events.

During a 1980 break-in at the Erskine Ramsay Archaeological Repository at Moundville, 264 pottery vessels, one fifth of the vessel collection curated by the Alabama Museum of Natural History, were stolen. The highest-quality specimens were taken. Despite an investigation by the Federal Bureau of Investigation, none of the artifacts was seen again until 2018 when three ceremonial bowls were anonymously returned.

In 1991, the park's name was officially changed to Moundville Archaeological Park. In November 2021, the Native American Graves Protection and Repatriation Review Committee found the site to be culturally linked to the seven Muskogean-speaking tribes who have petitioned for the return of 5,982 human remains and funerary objects.

== Site ==
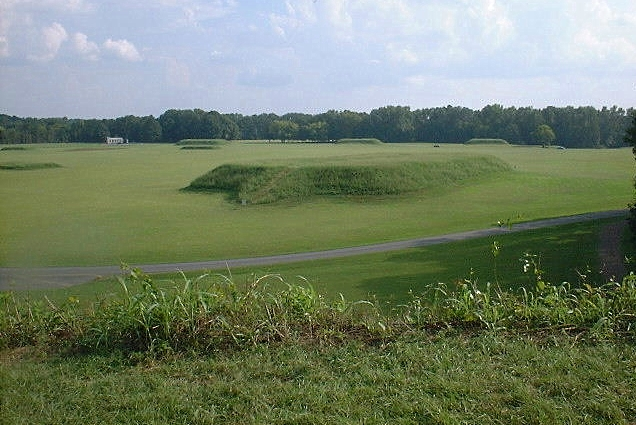
A view of the site from the top of Mound B looking toward Mound A and the plaza

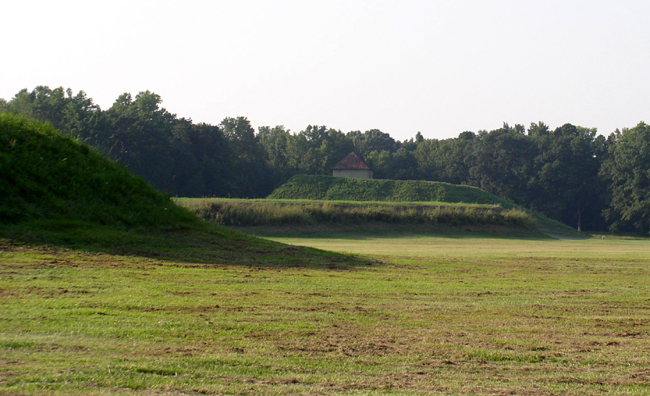
A view across the plaza from mound J to mound B, with mound A in the center

The site was occupied by Native Americans of the Mississippian culture from around 1000 AD to 1450 AD. Around 1150 AD the settlement's leaders began their rise from a local to a regional center, known as a chiefdom. At its height, the community took the form of a roughly 300-acre (121 ha) residential and political area, protected on three sides by a bastioned wooden palisade wall. The remaining side was protected by the river bluff.

The largest platform mounds were built on the northern edge of the plaza; they become increasingly smaller going either clockwise or counter clockwise around the plaza to the south. Scholars theorize that the highest-ranking clans occupied the large northern mounds, with the smaller mounds' supporting buildings used for residences, mortuary, and other purposes. A total of 29 mounds remain on the site.

Of the two largest mounds in the group, Mound A occupies a central position in the great plaza, and Mound B lies just to the north. It is a steep, 58 feet (18 m)-tall pyramidal mound with two access ramps. Archaeologists have also found evidence at the site of borrow pits, other public buildings, and many small houses constructed of pole and thatch.

Archaeologists have interpreted this community plan as a sociogram, an architectural depiction of a social order based on ranked clans. According to this model, the Moundville community was segmented into a variety of different clan precincts, the ranked positions of which were represented in the size and arrangement of paired earthen mounds around the central plaza. By 1300, the site was being used more as a religious and political center than as a residential town. This signaled the beginning of a decline, and by 1500 most of the area was abandoned.

== Population ==
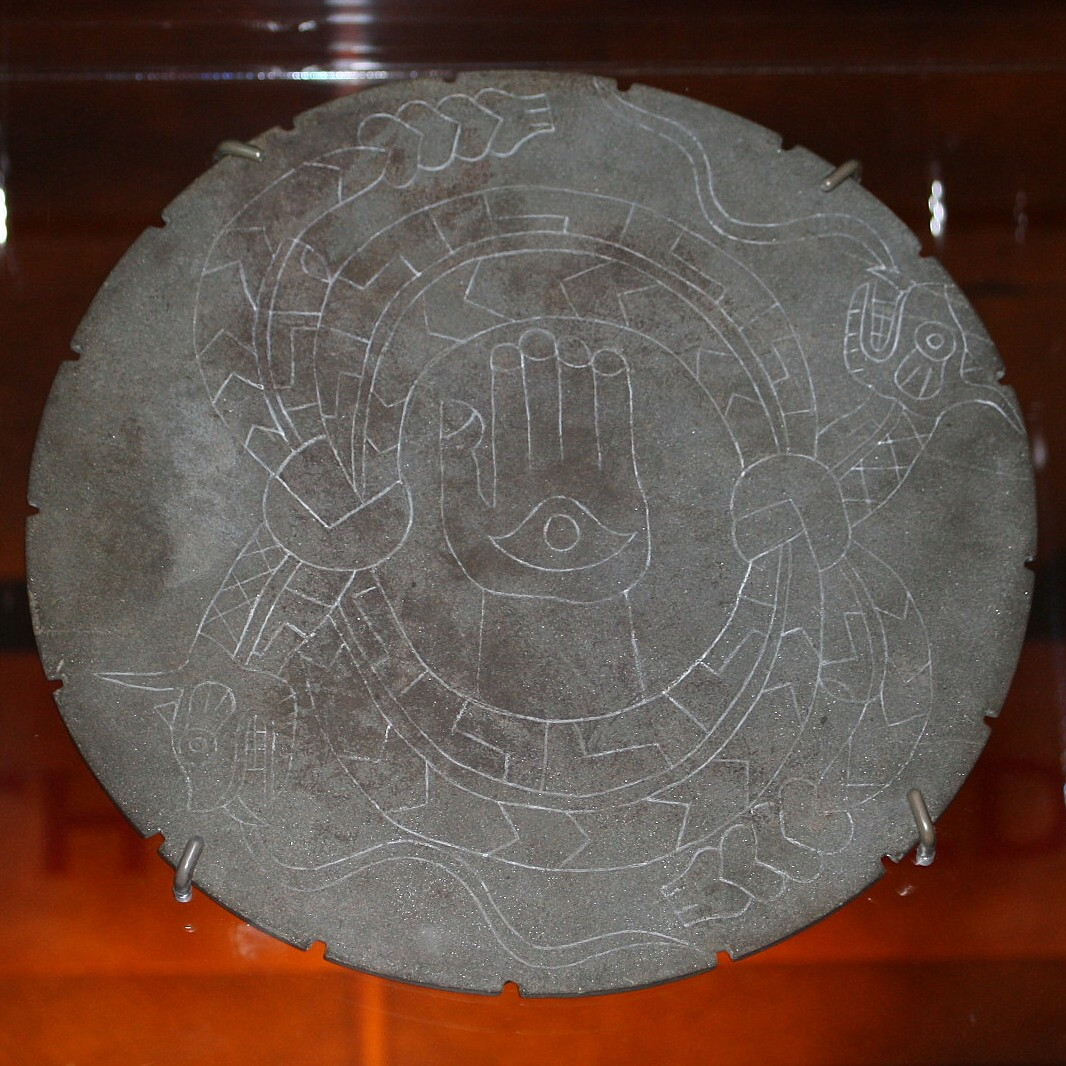
Engraved stone palette from Moundville, illustrating two horned rattlesnakes, perhaps referring to The Great Serpent of the Southeastern Ceremonial Complex

The surrounding area appears to have been densely populated, but the people built relatively few mounds before AD 1200, after which the public architecture of the plaza and mounds was constructed. At its height, the population is estimated to have been around 1,000 to 3,000 people within the walls, with 10,000 additional people in the surrounding river valley.

Based on findings during excavations, the residents of the site were skilled in agriculture, especially the cultivation of maize. Production of maize surpluses gave the people time produce to trade for other goods, supported population density, and allowed craft specialization. Extensive amounts of imported luxury goods, such as copper, mica, galena, and marine shell, have been excavated from the site. The site is renowned by scholars for the artistic excellence of its artifacts of pottery, stonework, and embossed copper left by the former residents.

== Excavations and interpretation ==
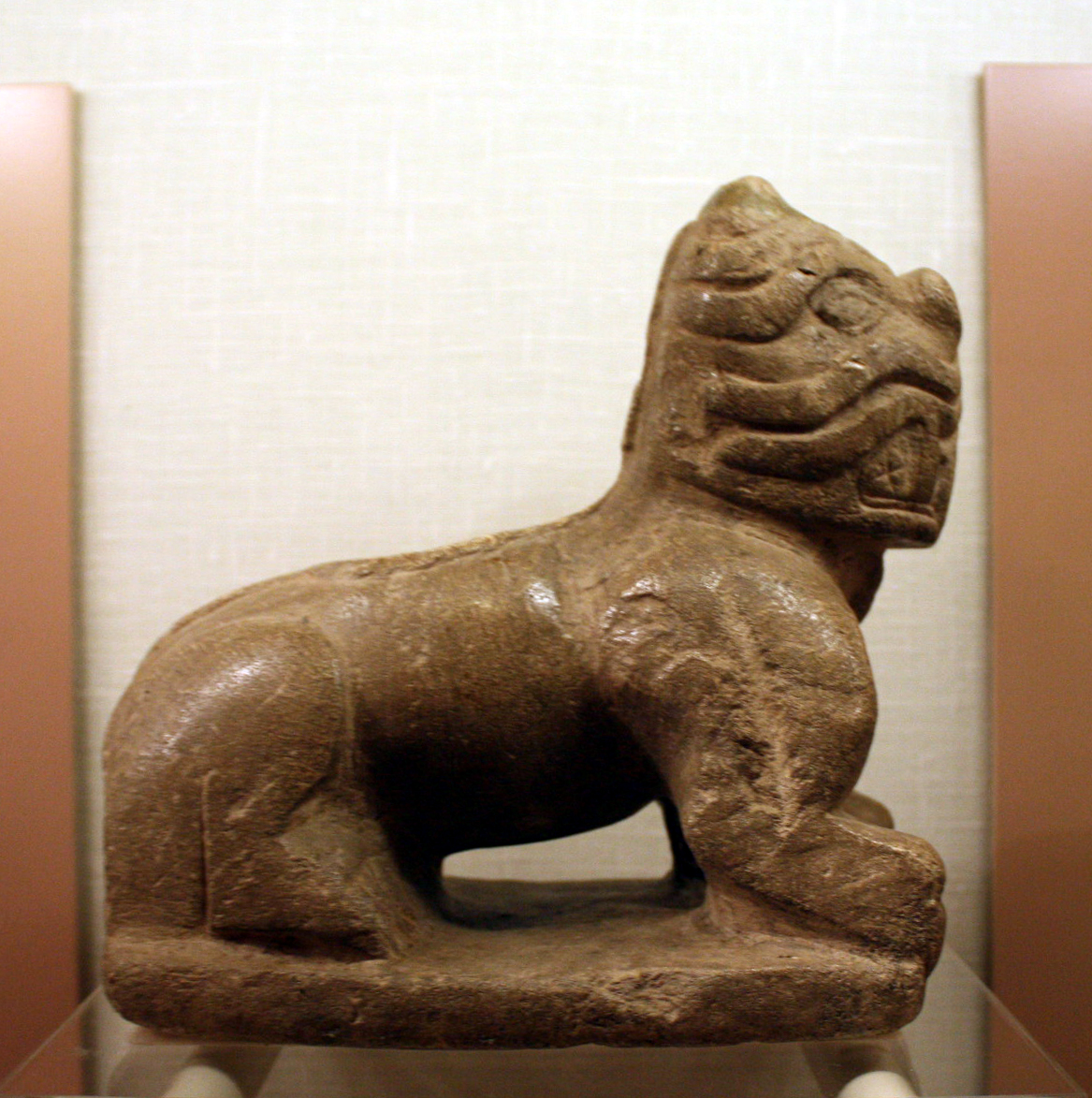
Feline statuette excavated at the Moundville site

The first major excavations were done in 1905 and 1906 by Clarence Bloomfield Moore, an independent archeologist, before archaeology had become a professional field of scholarship. His work first brought the site national attention and contributed to archaeologists developing the concept of the Southeastern Ceremonial Complex. One of his many discoveries was a finely carved diorite bowl depicting a crested wood duck. He later donated this work to the Smithsonian Institution, together with more than 500 other pieces.

Although the state had shown little interest in the site, after Moore removed this and many of the site's finest artifacts, the Alabama Legislature passed a law prohibiting people from taking any other artifacts from the state. Archaeological techniques in general were relatively crude when compared to modern standards, but some professionals even during his time criticized Moore for his excavation techniques.

The first large-scale scientific excavations of the site began in 1929 by Walter B. Jones, director of the Alabama Museum of Natural History, and the archaeologist David L. DeJarnette. During the 1930s, Jones used some workers from the Civilian Conservation Corps for excavation as well as stabilization of the mounds. This was a work program developed by the President Franklin D. Roosevelt administration during the Great Depression.

In the 1960s, Christopher Peebles examined the hundreds of human burials excavated at Moundville in the 1930s. Based on the location of burials and the kinds of artifacts found in the graves, he assigned a social status to the burial categories. He concluded that people buried in the mounds with highly crafted ornaments of stone, shell, and copper were of higher status than the majority of people buried elsewhere without the rare ornaments. Because some children with the rare ornaments were too young to have earned their high status, Peebles concluded that the highest social status at Moundville was inherited.

In the early 21st century, excavations at Moundville were directed by University of Alabama archaeologists Dr. John Blitz, Dr. Vernon Knight, and their students, with additional research by University of North Carolina archaeologists. An accurate chronology of the site's history was created, revealing that the mound plan, plaza, and mile-long wooden palisade fortification were constructed in the early 13th century.

The space encircled by the mounds was constructed by an enormous labor project that filled and leveled the area to create a plaza. Remote sensing and excavations discovered that the plaza was not an empty space but contained the remains of hundreds of buildings. Mound A, at the center of the plaza, was the early focus of the site plan, with structures arranged around a small, adjacent plaza that was later covered by fill. Mound X, a small mound, was leveled to create the site plan.

The Moundville people lived in groups of 10-20 houses arranged around the plaza. The mounds are flat-topped earthen pyramids built in stages., with remains of buildings with ritual and residential functions. Moundville's population began to leave the site in the 14th century and mound construction ceased. Precisely why the site was depopulated is unknown, but single-mound sites were established nearby at this time and people returned to Moundville to bury their dead at the location of the abandoned house groups. By the mid-16th century, when Spanish conquistador Hernando de Soto's army passed through the region, Moundville was abandoned.

=== Ceramics ===
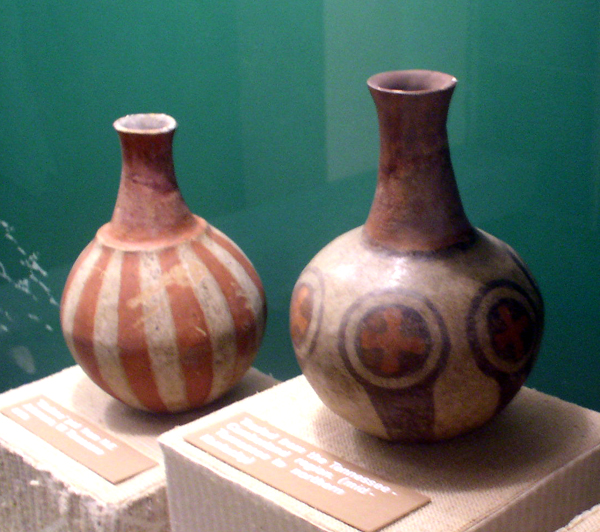
Mississippian culture pottery found at the Moundville site

Two major varieties of pottery are associated with the Moundville site. The Hemphill style pottery is a locally produced ware with a distinctive engraving tradition, and is mostly associated with burial practices. The other variety consists of painted vessels, many of which were not produced locally, which is evidence of trade taking place among other societies outside of the one that lived in Moundville. Unlike the engraved pottery, the negative-painted pottery seems to have been used only by the elites at the Moundville site, as it has not been found outside the site.

=== Moundville Archaeological Site Human Remains Controversy ===
In accordance with the 1990 Native American Graves Protection and Repatriation Act (NAGPRA), institutions such as universities and museums are required to document any discovered human remains and return them to the appropriate indigenous tribes. However, there is debate surrounding which modern tribes have a substantial claim to the human remains found at American excavation sites.

In the case of Moundville, currently seven tribes assert descendancy to the 5,892 human remains who have been excavated there. Those tribes are:

- Alabama-Quassarte Tribal Town
- Chickasaw Nation
- Choctaw Nation of Oklahoma
- Coushatta Tribe of Louisiana
- Muscogee (Creek) Nation
- Seminole Nation of Oklahoma
- Seminole Tribe of Florida

There is archaeological evidence that descendants of Moundville's population dispersed to the Tombigbee River and Alabama River regions. Based on the location of Muskogean-language speakers at the time of European contact and the tracing of artifact styles derived from Moundville to these locations, the probable descendants of Moundville's population are the Muskogee Nation, the Choctaw Nation, and the Chickasaw Nation. In 2024, the human remains and many of the associated artifacts were repatriated to the descendant tribes.

== Geography ==
The Moundville Archaeological Site is located on a bluff overlooking the Black Warrior River. The site and other affiliated settlements are located within a portion of the Black Warrior River Valley starting below the fall line, just south of present-day Tuscaloosa, Alabama, and extending 25 miles (40 km) downriver. Below the fall line, the valley widens and the uplands consist of rolling hills dissected by intermittent streams. This region corresponds with the transition between the Piedmont and Coastal Plain and encompasses considerable physiographic and ecological diversity. Environmentally this portion of the Black Warrior Valley was an ecotone that had floral and faunal characteristics from temperate oak-hickory, maritime magnolia, and pine forests.

== See also ==
- Bottle Creek Mounds
- Jere Shine site
- Ocmulgee Mounds National Historical Park
- Taskigi Mound
- List of National Historic Landmarks in Alabama
