= Lake Oconee =

Man-made reservoir in Georgia, United States

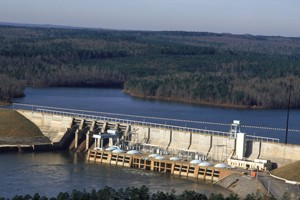

- Location within Georgia Location within the United States
- Location: Georgia
- Coordinates: 33°21′00″N 83°09′25″W
- Type: reservoir
- Primary inflows: Oconee River, Apalachee River (Georgia)
- Primary outflows: Oconee River
- Basin countries: United States
- Max. length: 20 mi (32 km)
- Max. width: Less than 1 mi (1.6 km)
- Surface area: 19,071 acres (7,718 ha)
- Average depth: 21 ft (6.4 m)
- Max. depth: 102 ft (31 m)
- Shore length^{1}: 376 mi (605 km)
- Surface elevation: 434 ft (132 m)
- ^{1} Shore length is not a well-defined measure.

Lake Oconee is a reservoir in central Georgia, United States, on the Oconee River near Greensboro and Eatonton. It was created in 1979 when Georgia Power completed the construction of the Wallace Dam on the Oconee River.

Lake Oconee runs through Georgia's Morgan, Greene, and Putnam counties and is separated from its sister lake, Sinclair, by Wallace Dam.

Oconee is the name of an ancient Creek town.

== Hydrology ==
Lake Oconee serves as a reservoir for Georgia Power Company's Wallace Hydroelectric Plant. The lake has 374 miles (602 km) of shoreline with a surface area of 19,971 acres (8,082 ha). It is formed by the Oconee River and Apalachee River (Georgia)

== Housing ==
Lake Oconee is home to a number of golf communities, including Reynolds Lake Oconee, Cuscowilla, and Harbor Club. There are also senior living communities including Del Webb at Lake Oconee.
