= Smithsonian trinomial =

Identifier assigned to archaeological sites

A Smithsonian trinomial (formally the Smithsonian Institution Trinomial System, abbreviated SITS) is a unique identifier assigned to archaeological sites in many states in the United States. Trinomials are composed of a one or two digit coding for the state, typically two letters coding for the county or county-equivalent within the state, and one or more sequential digits representing the order in which the site was listed in that county. The Smithsonian Institution developed the site number system in the 1930s and 1940s, but it no longer maintains the system. Trinomials are now assigned by the individual states. The 48 states then in the union were assigned numbers in alphabetical order. Alaska was assigned number 49 and Hawaii was assigned number 50, after those states were admitted to the union. There is no Smithsonian trinomial number assigned for the District of Columbia or any United States territory.

Most states use trinomials of the form "nnAAnnnn", but some specify a space or dash between parts of the identifier, i.e., "nn AA nnnn" or "nn-AA-nnnn". Some states use variations of the trinomial system. Arizona, California, Connecticut, Maine, Rhode Island, and Vermont use two-letter abbreviations of the state name instead of the Smithsonian number. Alaska uses three-letter abbreviations for USGS map quadrangles in place of the county code. Arizona uses a five-part identifier based on USGS maps, specifying quadrangles, then rectangles within a quadrangle, a sequential number within the rectangle, and a code identifying the agency issuing the sequential number. California uses a three-letter abbreviation for counties. Connecticut and Rhode Island do not use any sub-state codes, with site identifiers consisting of the state abbreviation and a sequential number series for the whole state. Delaware uses a single letter code for counties and adds a block code (A-K) within each county, with sequential numbers for each block. Hawaii uses a four-part identifier, "50" for the state, a two-digit code for the island, then a two-digit code to designate the USGS topographical quad, plus a four digit sequential site number for sites on each island.

== Archaeological site identification codes used by states ==
| State | Format | County or equivalent codes |
|---|---|---|
| Alabama | 1AAnnnn | AA: The code for a county is the first two letters in the county's name, with the following exceptions: Barbour=Br, Bibb=Bb, Blount=Bt, Bullock=Bk, Cherokee=Ce, Clinton=Cn, Choctaw=Cw, Clarke=Ck, Clay=Cy, Cleburne=Cb, Colbert=Ct, Conecuh=Cc, Coosa=Cs, Dallas=Ds, DeKalb=Dk, Elmore=Ee, Lamar=Lr, Lauderdale=Lu, Macon=Mc, Maringo=Mo, Marion=My, Marshall=Ms, Mobile=Mb, Monroe=Mn, Montgomery=Mt, Morgan=Mg, St. Clair=Sc, Tallapoosa=Tp, Washington=Wn, and Wilcox=Wx. |
| Alaska | 49‑AAA‑nnnn | AAA: Three letter codes are abbreviations of the names for quadrangles on USGS maps for Alaska. |
| Arizona | AZ AA:NN:nn(XXX) | AA: One or two letter code, A through FF, identifying USGS map quadrangles (one degree of latitude by one degree of longitude) in Arizona. NN: One or two digit number, 1 though 16, identifying rectangles (15' USGS maps) in a quadrangle map. |
| Arkansas | 3AAnnnn | List of counties in Arkansas |
| California | CA‑AAA‑nnnn | AAA: County Abbreviation Codes (Appendix 1) |
| Colorado | 5AAnnnn | AA: County Abbreviation Codes |
| Connecticut | CT‑nnnnn | No county code; state abbreviation and a sequential number only |
| Delaware | 7ABnnnn | A: K = Kent County, N = New Castle County, and S = Sussex County. B: Figure 25: Map of blocks |
| Florida | 8AAnnnn | AA: The code for a county is the first two letters in the county's name, with the following exceptions: Bay=BY, Bradford=BF, Broward=BD, Collier=CR, Gadsden=GD, Hardee=HR, Hendry=HN, Highlands=HG, Lafayette=LF, Lee=LL, Levy=LV, Madison=MD, Marion=MR, Martin=MT, Miami-Dade=DA, Okeechobee=OB, Palm Beach=PB, St. Johns=SJ, St. Lucie=SL, Santa Rosa=SR, Sarasota=SO, Sumter=SM, Walton=WL, and Washington=WS. |
| Georgia | 9AAnnnn | AA: County Abbreviation Codes |
| Hawaii | 50‑AA‑BB‑nnnn | AA: 10 = Hawaii, 20 = Kaho'olawi, 30 = Kaua'i, 40 = Lana'i, 50 = Maui, 60 = Moloka'i, 80 = O'ahu, 91 = Necker, 92 = Nihoa; BB: USGS Quad number |
| Idaho | 10AAnnnn | AA: Idaho County Abbreviations for Site Designation |
| Illinois | 11AAnnnn | List of counties in Illinois |
| Indiana | 12AAnnnn | List of counties in Indiana |
| Iowa | 13AAnnnn | AA: Iowa County Abbreviations for Site Designation |
| Kansas | 14AAnnnn | AA: Kansas County Abbreviations for Archeological Trinomials |
| Kentucky | 15AAnnnn | List of counties in Kentucky ADAIR (AD); ALLEN (AL); ANDERSON (AN); BALLARD (BA); BARREN (BN); BATH (BH); BELL (BL); BOONE (BE); BOURBON (BB); BOYD (BD); BOYLE (BO); BRACKEN (BK); BREATHITT (BR); BRECKINRIDGE (BC); BULLITT (BU); BUTLER (BT); CALDWELL (CA); CALLOWAY (CW); CAMPBELL (CP); CARLISLE (CE); CARROLL (CL); CARTER (CR); CASEY (CS); CHRISTIAN (CH); CLARK (CK); CLAY (CY); CLINTON (CT); CRITTENDEN (CN); CUMBERLAND (CU); DAVIESS (DA); EDMONSON (ED); ELLIOTT (EL); ESTILL (ES); FAYETTE (FA); FLEMING (FL); FLOYD (FD); FRANKLIN (FR); FULTON (FU); GALLATIN (GA); GARRARD (GD); GRANT (GR); GRAVES (GV); GRAYSON (GY); GREEN (GN); GREENUP (GP); HANCOCK (HA); HARDIN (HD); HARLAN (HL); HARRISON (HR); HART (HT); HENDERSON (HE); HENRY (HY); HICKMAN (HI); HOPKINS (HK); JACKSON (JA); JEFFERSON (JF); JESSAMINE (JS); JOHNSON (JO); KENTON (KE); KNOTT (KT); KNOX (KX); LARUE (LU); LAUREL (LL); LAWRENCE (LA); LEE (LE); LESLIE (LS); LETCHER (LR); LEWIS (LW); LINCOLN (LI); LIVINGSTON (LV); LOGAN (LO); LYON (LY); MCCRACKEN (MCN); MCCREARY (MCY); MCLEAN (MCL); MADISON (MA); MAGOFFIN (MG); MARION (MN); MARSHALL (ML); MARTIN (MT); MASON (MS); MEADE (MD); MENIFEE (MF); MERCER (ME); METCALFE (MC); MONROE (MR); MONTGOMERY (MM); MORGAN (MO); MUHLENBERG (MU); NELSON (NE); NICHOLAS (NI); OHIO (OH); OLDHAM (OL); OWEN (ON); OWSLEY (OW); PENDLETON (PD); PERRY (PE); PIKE (PI); POWELL (PO); PULASKI (PU); ROBERTSON (RB); ROCKCASTLE (RK); ROWAN (RO); RUSSELL (RU); SCOTT (SC); SHELBY (SH); SIMPSON (SI); SPENCER (SP); TAYLOR (TA); TODD (TO); TRIGG (TR); TRIMBLE (TM); UNION (UN); WARREN (WA); WASHINGTON (WS); WAYNE (WN); WEBSTER (WE); WHITLEY (WH); WOLFE (WO); WOODFORD (WD) |
| Louisiana | 16AAnnnn | List of parishes in Louisiana |
| Maine | ME-nn-nn | |
| Maryland | 18AAnnnn | List of counties in Maryland |
| Massachusetts | 19-AA-nnnn | |
| Michigan | 20AAnnnn | List of counties in Michigan |
| Minnesota | 21AAnnnn | AA: Trinomial Site Designations for MN Counties |
| Mississippi | 22‑AA‑nnnn | List of counties in Mississippi |
| Missouri | 23AAnnnn | List of counties in Missouri |
| Montana | 24AAnnnn | AA: Trinomial Site Designations for MT Counties |
| Nebraska | 25AAnnnn | |
| Nevada | 26AAnnnn | |
| New Hampshire | 27‑AA‑nnnn | AA: Belknap (BK) · Carroll (CA) · Cheshire (CH) · Coos (CO) · Grafton (GR) · Hillsborough (HB) · Merrimack (MR) · Rockingham (RK) · Strafford (ST) · Sullivan (SU) |
| New Jersey | 28AAnnnn | |
| New Mexico | 29AAnnnn | |
| New York | AAAAA.nnnnnn | First five digits are the Minor Civil Division, followed by a sequential number for sites within that division. |
| North Carolina | 31AAnnnn | List of counties in North Carolina AA: Alamance (AM) · Alexander (AX) · Alleghany (AL) · Anson (AN) · Ashe (AH) · Avery (Av) · Beaufort (BF) · Bertie (BR) · Bladen (BL) · Brunswick (BW) · Buncombe (BN) · Burke (BK) · Cabarrus (CA) · Caldwell (CW) · Camden (CM) · Carteret (CR) · Caswell (CS) · Catawba (CT) · Chatham (CH) · Cherokee (CE) · Chowan (CO) · Clay (CY) · Cleveland (CL) · Columbus (CB) · Craven (CV) · Cumberland (CD) · Currituck (CK) · Dare (DR) · Davidson (DV) · Davie (DE) · Duplin (DP) · Durham (DH) · Edgecombe (ED) · Forsyth (FY) · Franklin (FK) · Gaston (GS) · Gates (GA) · Graham (GH) · Granville (GV) · Greene (GR) · Guilford (GF) · Halifax (HX) · Harnett (HT) · Haywood (HW) · Henderson (HN) · Hertford (HF) · Hoke (HK) · Hyde (HY) · Iredell (ID) · Jackson (JK) · Johnston (JT) · Jones (JN) · Lee (LE) · Lenoir (LR) · Lincoln (LN) · Macon (MA) · Madison (MD) · Martin (MT) · McDowell (MC) · Mecklenburg (MK) · Mitchell (ML) · Montgomery (MG) · Moore (MR) · Nash (NS) · New Hanover (NH) · Northampton (NP) · Onslow (ON) · Orange (OR) · Pamlico (PM) · Pasquotank (PK) · Pender (PD) · Perquimans (PQ) · Person (PR) · Pitt (PT) · Polk (PL) · Randolph (RD) · Richmond (RH) · Robeson (RB) · Rockingham (RK) · Rowan (RW) · Rutherford (RF) · Sampson (SP) · Scotland (SC) · Stanly (ST) · Stokes (SK) · Surry (SR) · Swain (SW) · Transylvania (TV) · Tyrrell (TY) · Union (UN) · Vance (VN) · Wake (WA) · Warren (WR) · Washington (WH) · Watauga (WT) · Wayne (WY) · Wilkes (WK) · Wilson (WL) · Yadkin (YD) · Yancey (YC) |
| North Dakota | 32AAnnnn | AA: NDCRS Site Form Training Manual - Section I: Site Identification - County Codes (Page 10) |
| Ohio | 33‑AA‑nnnn | AA: Appendix B: County Codes (OAI Codes) (Page 61) |
| Oklahoma | 34AAnnnn | AA: Table 1 |
| Oregon | 35‑AA‑nnnn | List of counties in Oregon |
| Pennsylvania | 36‑AA‑nnnn | List of counties in Pennsylvania |
| Rhode Island | RI‑nnnn | No county code; state abbreviation and a sequential number only |
| South Carolina | 38AAnnnn | List of counties in South Carolina AA: Abbeville (AB) · Aiken (AK) · Allendale (AL) · Anderson (AN) · Bamberg (BA) · Barnwell (BR) · Beaufort (BU) · Berkeley (BK) · Calhoun (CL) · Charleston (CH) · Cherokee (CK) · Chester (CS) · Chesterfield (CT) · Clarendon (CR) · Colleton (CN) · Darlington (DA) · Dillon (DN) · Dorchester (DR) · Edgefield (ED) · Fairfield (FA) · Florence (FL) · Georgetown (GE) · Greenville (GV) · Greenwood (GN) · Hampton (HA) · Horry (HR) · Jasper (JA) · Kershaw (KE) · Lancaster (LA) · Laurens (LU) · Lee (LE) · Lexington (LX) · Marion (MA) · Marlboro (ML) · McCormick (MC) · Newberry (NB) · Oconee (OC) · Orangeburg (OR) · Pickens (PK) · Richland (RD) · Saluda (SA) · Spartanburg (SP) · Sumter (SU) · Union (UN) · Williamsburg (WG) · York (YK) |
| South Dakota | 39AAnnnn | |
| Tennessee | 40AAnnnn | AA: County Abbreviations for Archaeological Site Numbers |
| Texas | 41AAnnnn | AA: Texas County Abbreviations |
| Utah | 42‑AA‑nnnn | AA: List of counties in Utah (p. 3) |
| Vermont | VT‑AA‑nnnn | AA: Addison (AD) · Bennington (BE) · Caledonia (CA) · Chittenden (CH) · Essex (ES) · Franklin (FR) · Grand Isle (GI) · Lamoille (LA) · Orange (OR) · Orleans (OL) · Rutland (RU) · Washington (WA) · Windham (WD) · Windsor (WN) |
| Virginia | 44-AA-nnnn | List of county and city abbreviations in Virginia |
| Washington | 45‑AA‑nnnn | List of counties in Washington |
| West Virginia | 46‑AA‑nnnn | List of counties in West Virginia |
| Wisconsin | 47‑AA‑nnnn | List of counties in Wisconsin |
| Wyoming | 48AAnnnn | List of counties in Wyoming and also YE for sites within Yellowstone National Park |
