= Platform mound =

Earthwork or mound intended to support a structure or activity

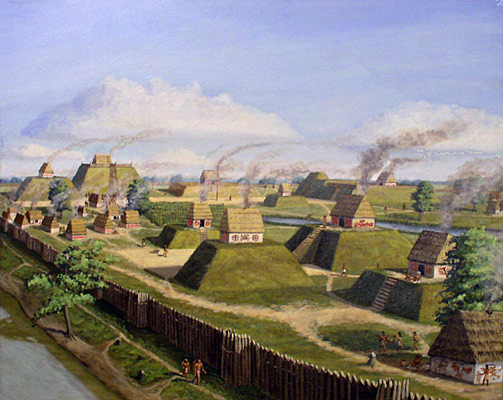
The Kincaid site in Massac County, Illinois, showing platform mounds. Illustration by artist Herb Roe.

A platform mound is any earthwork or mound intended to support a structure or elevate an activity. It typically refers to a flat-topped mound whose sides may be cylindrical or pyramidal, forming a frustum.

== In Eastern North America ==
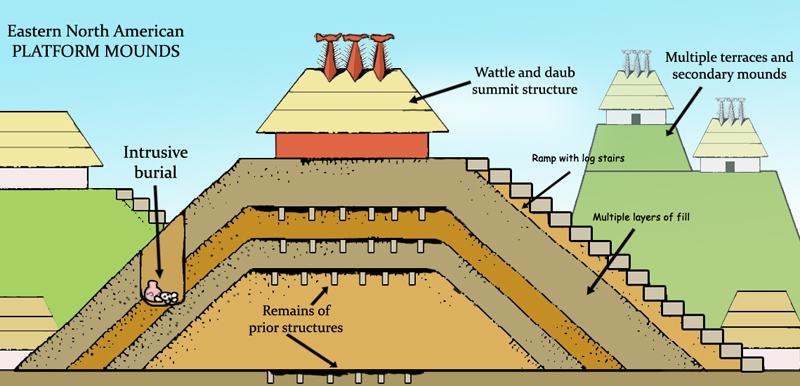
A diagram showing the various components of Eastern North American indigenous ceremonial substructure mounds

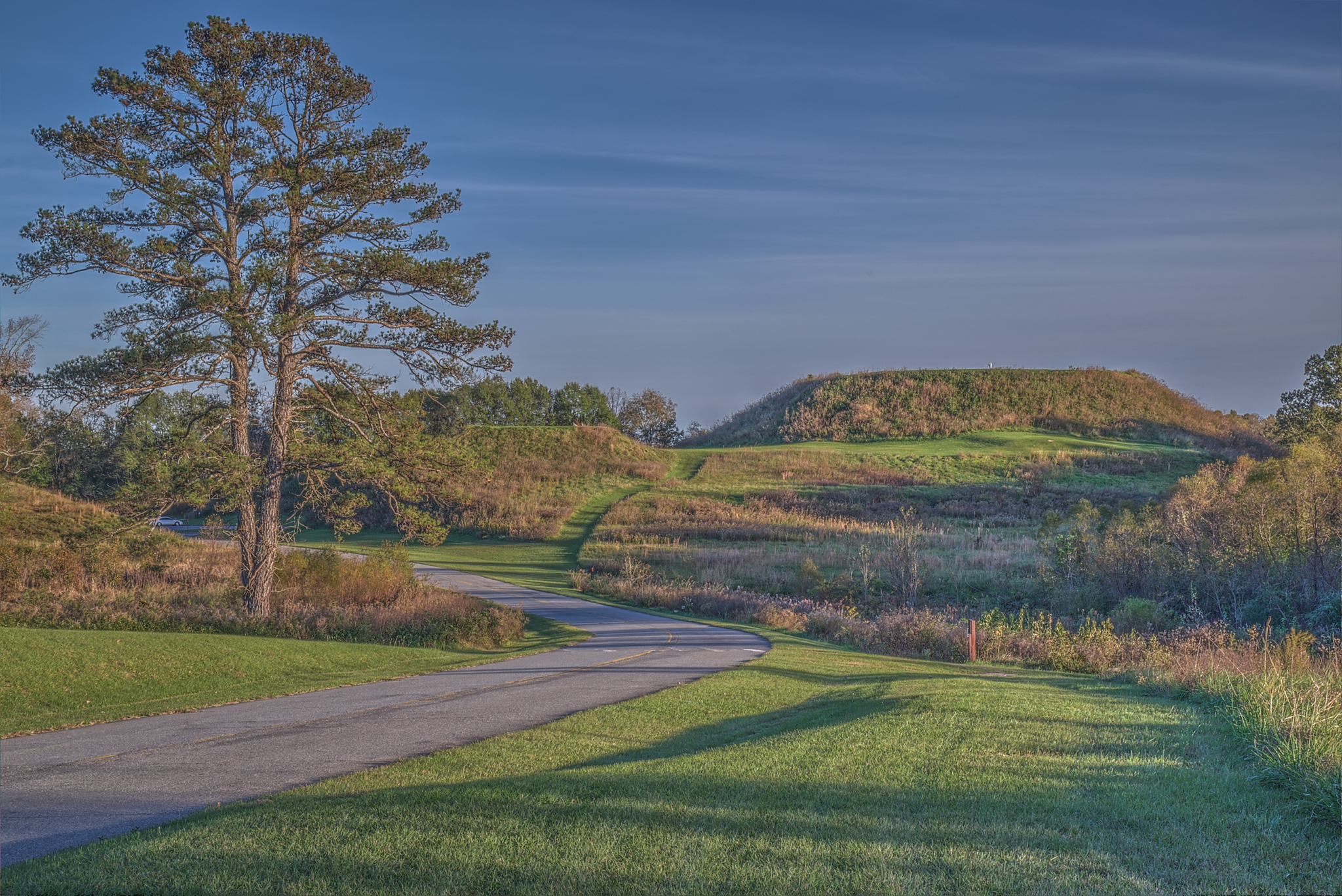
Temple Mound at Ocmulgee National Monument

The indigenous peoples of North America built substructure mounds for well over a thousand years, starting in the Archaic period and continuing through the Woodland period. Many different archaeological cultures (Poverty Point culture, Troyville culture, Coles Creek culture, Plaquemine culture and Mississippian culture) of North Americas Eastern Woodlands are specifically well known for using platform mounds as a central aspect of their overarching religious practices and beliefs.

These platform mounds are usually four-sided truncated pyramids, steeply sided, with steps built of wooden logs ascending one side of the earthworks. When Europeans first arrived in North America, the peoples of the Mississippian culture were still using and building platform mounds. Documented uses for Mississippian platform mounds include semi-public chief's house platforms, public temple platforms, mortuary platforms, charnel house platforms, earth lodge/town house platforms, residence platforms, square ground and rotunda platforms, and dance platforms.

Many of the mounds were the result of multiple episodes of mound construction, with the mound becoming larger with each event. The site of a mound was usually a site with special significance, either a pre-existing mortuary site or civic structure. This site was covered with a layer of basket-transported soil and clay known as mound fill, and a new structure constructed on its summit. At periodic intervals, averaged about twenty years, these structures would be removed, possibly ritually destroyed as part of renewal ceremonies, and a new layer of fill added, along with a new structure on the now higher summit. Sometimes the surface of the mounds would get a several inches thick coat of brightly colored clay. These layers also incorporated layers of different kinds of clay, soil and sod, an elaborate engineering technique to forestall slumping of the mounds and to ensure their steep sides did not collapse. This pattern could be repeated many times during the life of a site. The large amounts of fill needed for the mounds left large holes in the landscape now known by archaeologists as "borrow pits". These pits were sometimes left to fill with water and stocked with fish.

Some mounds were developed with separate levels (or terraces) and aprons, such as Emerald Mound, which is one large terrace with two smaller mounds on its summit; or Monks Mound, which has four separate levels and stands close to 100 feet (30 m) in height. Monks Mound had at least ten separate periods of mound construction over a 200-year period. Some of the terraces and aprons on the mound seem to have been added to stop slumping of the enormous mound.<

Although the mounds were primarily meant as substructure mounds for buildings or activities, sometimes burials did occur there. Intrusive burials occurred when a grave was dug into a mound and the body or a bundle of defleshed, disarticulated bones was deposited into it. For example, Mound C at Etowah has been found to have more than 100 intrusive burials into the final layer of the mound, with many grave goods added, such as Mississippian copper plates (Etowah plates), monolithic stone axes, ceremonial pottery and carved whelk shell gorgets. Also interred in this mound was a paired set of white marble Mississippian stone statues.

=== Interpretations ===
A long-standing interpretation of Mississippian mounds comes from Vernon James Knight, who stated that the Mississippian platform mounds were one of the three "sacra", or objects of sacred display, of the Mississippian religion – also see Earth/fertility cult and Southeastern Ceremonial Complex. He based his theory on analogy to ethnographic and historic data on related Native American tribal groups in the Southeastern United States.

Knight suggests a microcosmic ritual organization based around a "native earth" autochthony, agriculture, fertility, and purification scheme, in which mounds and the site layout replicate cosmology. Mound rebuilding episodes are construed as rituals of burial and renewal, while the four-sided construction acts to replicate the flat earth and the four quarters of the earth.

== In other cultures ==
The use of platform mounds is documented elsewhere in the world, including:

- in Mesoamerica, the Olmec and other groups - see Mesoamerican pyramids
- the Llanos de Moxos pre-Columbian era earthworks in the tropical savanna ecoregion of northern Bolivia
- the Norte Chico
- the Hohokam
- in periods of Ancient China - see Chinese pyramids

== See also ==
- Artificial dwelling hill – Raised ground to provide a refuge from flooding
- Earthworks (archaeology) – General term to describe artificial changes in land level in history and pre-history
- Barrow (archaeology) or kurgan – burial mounds, and other archaeological earthworks, commonly, "long barrows" and "round barrows"
- Tumulus – Mound of earth and stones raised over graves
