= Tolu, Kentucky =

Unincorporated community in Kentucky, United States

- Census-designated place
- Location within Kentucky
- Coordinates: 37°25′59″N 88°14′43″W
- Country: United States
- State: Kentucky
- County: Crittenden

Area
  - Total: 0.35 sq mi (0.90 km^{2})
  - Land: 0.35 sq mi (0.90 km^{2})
  - Water: 0 sq mi (0.00 km^{2})
- Elevation: 377 ft (115 m)

Population (2020)
  - Total: 81
  - Density: 233.6/sq mi (90.18/km^{2})
- Time zone: UTC-6 (Central (CST))
  - Summer (DST): UTC-5 (CDT)
- ZIP codes: 42084
- Area code: 270
- GNIS feature ID: 515965

Tolu is an unincorporated community and census-designated place (CDP) in Crittenden County, Kentucky, United States. As of the 2020 census, Tolu had a population of 81. It is located along Kentucky Route 135 near the Ohio River. It is 14 miles (23 km) northwest of Marion, the county seat.

== History ==
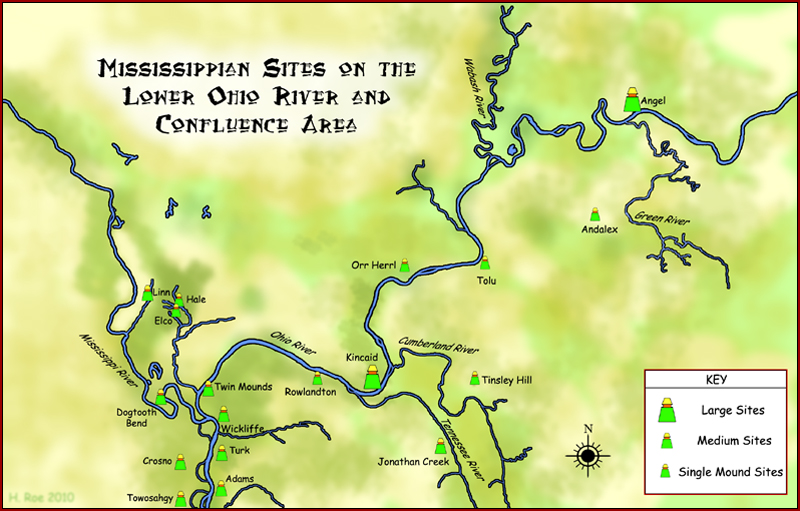
Tolu was one of many pre-Columbian Native American settlements of the Mississippian culture within the Ohio and Mississippi River valleys. The Cahokia Site on the Mississippi was the largest Mississippian settlement with a population of 20,000 inhabitants.

=== Prehistoric ===
The earliest known settlement in what became the future town of Tolu was the Native American prehistoric archeological site of the Mississippian culture, known today as the Tolu Site was built and occupied between 1000 CE-1350 CE. This sophisticated culture flourished in chiefdoms along the Ohio and Mississippi rivers, reaching its peak in size and power at Cahokia in present-day Illinois, the largest prehistoric complex north of Mexico. Peoples of the culture had wide trading networks spanning the continent along the Mississippi River, from the Great Lakes to the Gulf of Mexico.

The Tolu Site is part of the Angel phase of the Mississippian period. Because of similarities among the following sites in their styles of pottery and construction of communities, it is also considered part of the "Kincaid Set", together with Angel Mounds in Indiana and Kincaid Mounds in Illinois, and Wickliffe Mounds in far western Kentucky.

=== European settlement ===
By 1800, a small river front settlement developed that would later become Tolu, Kentucky and was for a time known as Kirksville.

From the 1790s-1830s, Tolu was under the control and influence of James Ford who led a double life serving both sides of the law as a justice of the peace, planter, businessman, ferry operator, criminal gang leader, state militia officer, river pirate, slave stealer, and slave trader. The rule of Ford came to an end with his murder in 1833.

Following a devastating windstorm in the 1830s, the town was renamed Hurricane Landing. In 1867, Hurricane Landing had an established post office. In 1884, the current town name was chosen after Tolu, a then popular hair tonic. The Hurricane Camp Meeting Grounds a Presbyterian revival camp was established in 1888-1889 and has its roots in the Hurricane Landing Church founded in 1843.

== Demographics ==
Historical population
Census	Pop.	Note	%±
2020	81		—
U.S. Decennial Census

== Arts and culture ==
=== Points of interest ===
- Tolu Site (prehistoric archeological site)
- Hurricane Camp Meeting Grounds
- James Ford Family Cemetery Site

== Notable people ==
- James Ford (1775–1833), was a civic leader and businessman who ran a Kentucky ferry crossing the Ohio River into Illinois, owned a five-hundred acre slave plantation in Tolu, and secret criminal leader of a gang of Ohio River pirates and highwaymen.
