= Tolu (disambiguation) =

Tolú is a small town and municipality in Sucre Department, northern Colombia.

Tolu may also refer to:

== Places ==
- Tolu, Kentucky, an unincorporated community and census-designated place in Crittenden County
- Tolu Site, a prehistoric archeological site near the above community

== People ==
- Tolu Ajayi (born 1946), Nigerian poet
- Tolu Fahamokioa (born 1991), Tongan rugby union player
- Tolu Smith (born 2000), American basketball player

== Other ==
- Tolu balsam, a recent (non-fossil) resin that originates from South America
- Myroxylon or tolu, a tree in Central and South America
- Tolumnia (plant), an orchid genus abbreviated Tolu

== See also ==
- Tola (disambiguation)
- Toloo, an Iranian newspaper
