= Ellerbusch site =

Archaeological site in Indiana, US

- Ellerbusch Archeological Site (12W56)
- U.S. National Register of Historic Places
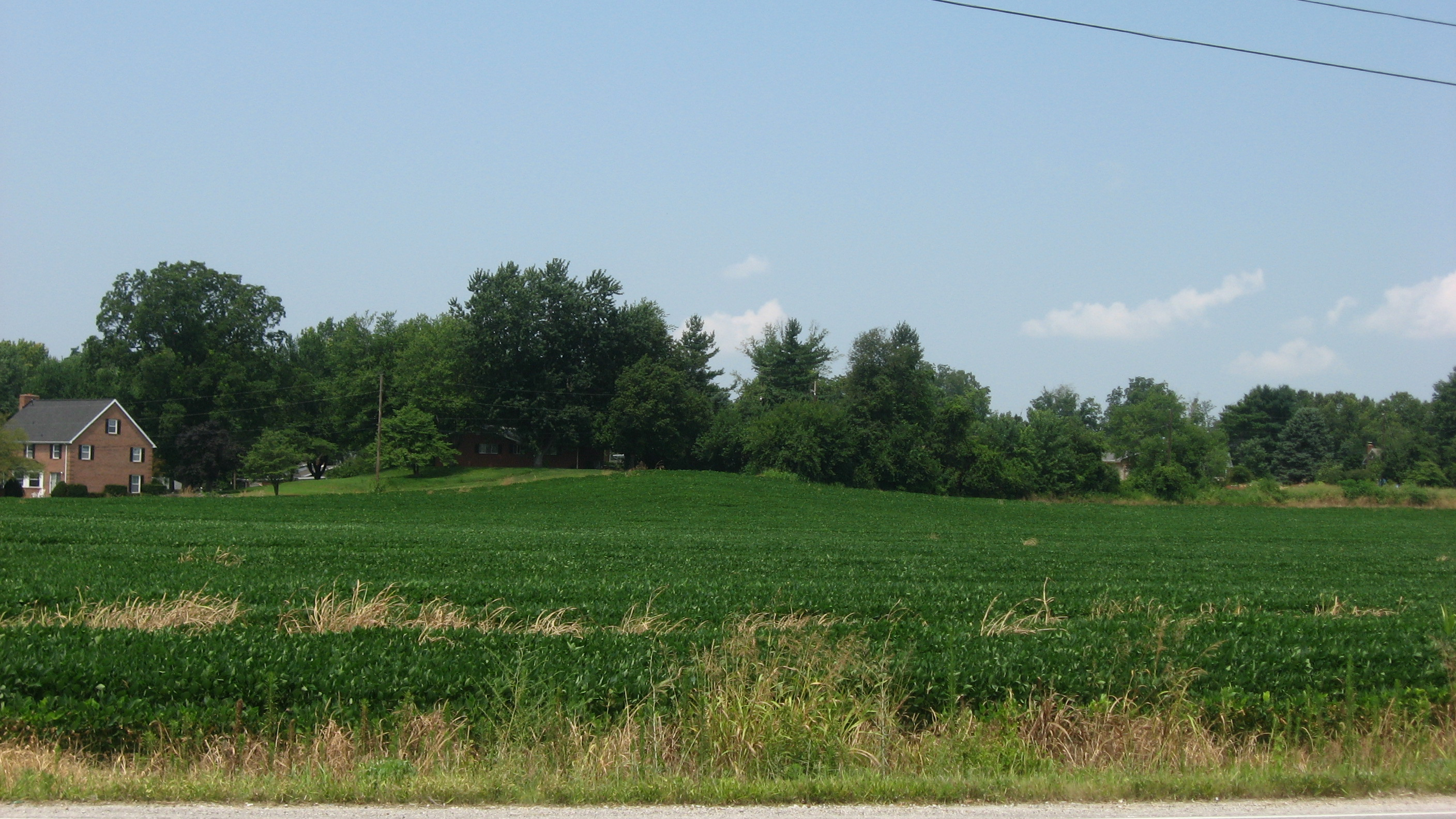
- Overview of the site from the southeast

- Location within Indiana Location within the United States
- Location: Atop the bluff northwest of the junction of State Road 662 and Ellerbursch Rd., west of Newburgh, Indiana
- Coordinates: 37°57′8″N 87°25′32″W
- Area: 0.8 acres (0.32 ha)
- NRHP reference No.: 91000270
- Added to NRHP: March 14, 1991

The Ellerbusch Site (12-W-56) is a small but significant archaeological site in the southwestern part of the U.S. state of Indiana. Unlike many sites created by people of the same culture, it occupies an upland site near a major river floodplain. Its existence appears to have been the result of the coincidence of periods of peace and growth in the related Angel site, which led some townspeople to leave their homes for new villages that were more convenient for resource gathering. Researched partly because of its small size, Ellerbusch has produced information that greatly increases present awareness of other small sites and of its culture's overall patterns of settlement in the region. Because of its archaeological value, the site was declared a historic site in the late twentieth century.

== Environment ==
The immediate vicinity is known to be archaeologically rich; although a cursory survey in 1954 failed to find Ellerbusch and revealed nothing in any other part of section 33 of Ohio Township, it revealed four substantial sites in adjacent sections, including a village on the riverbank about 0.5 miles (0.80 km) to the southwest of where Ellerbusch was later discovered.

== Excavation ==
The first excavations at the site were undertaken by the Ellerbusch family, who owned the property, working with their neighbors George and Francis Martin of the Glenn Black Laboratory of Archaeology at Indiana University in Bloomington. The Martins arranged for the aid of an IU graduate student in the early excavations, and with his help they revealed the site of one house, part of another, and a pit with decorated potsherds in the summer of 1957; this initial excavation was published in the following year. Comparatively little was done in 1958 and 1959, and no further work was performed except for a very limited excavation in 1962.

In June 1973, IU doctoral student Thomas J. Green began to study the possibility of renewing work at the now-overgrown Ellerbusch Site, funded by the Black Laboratory, which wanted to excavate a small site extensively in order to understand smaller sites' economic activities, the organization of their communities, and the times of year when they were occupied. Moreover, the excavation of a small site was deemed necessary for a broader awareness of typical Mississippian settlement patterns, because scholars' concentration on large sites meant that nothing more than hypotheses could be offered to understand relationships between such centers and the small outlying sites surrounding them. Besides the work done by the owners, Green's reasons for choosing Ellerbusch included its upland location beside a lake, its proximity to Angel, the fact that virtually everything collected from the site was owned by the property owners (thus permitting a unified collection of artifacts, in contrast to the dispersion of artifacts among many collections that is typical of such sites), and the evidence from previous work that the houses had not been rebuilt numerous times as they had at Angel.

== Artifacts recovered ==
=== Early excavations ===
The initial excavations by the Ellerbusches and Martins revealed 129 sherds — 41 clay-tempered sandy pieces, 61 cord-marked, 18 plain, and 9 small decorated pieces that could not easily be classified — 23 stone tools, most of which were knives, and occasional pieces of mica and cannel coal. Based on the pottery that they found, Frances Martin proposed that the site originated primarily during the Middle Woodland period in an occupation influenced by Hopewellian peoples, and she saw certain elements of the pottery as linking the site to the Swift Creek culture that was based in Georgia.

=== Pottery ===
Green's excavation demonstrated that all artifacts not found on the surface were located in the plow zone or in features such as pits. However, excavations through 1977 yielded 3,466 sherds of pottery, including 582 from the Woodland period, and 2,884 shards that were attributable to the Angel Phase; over 98% of them are shell-tempered without decoration. This is comparable to the pottery found at Angel, where less than one percent of the many thousands of pieces of pottery bore ornamental ceramic elements. Conversely, while many of the decorated remnant of Angel sherds bear either a red film or negative painting, the same is true of just six pieces of Ellerbusch pottery. Most sherds found at the site were small; of the 151 pieces of shell-tempered pottery, only 19 were large enough for the excavation team to determine the shape of the pottery from which the sherds came. As a result, the number of pottery objects originally present at the site could not be estimated reliably; most comparable sites yield larger sherds with fewer fractures, although as a high proportion of Ellerbusch sherds were found in or above the plow zone, their small size is comparable to sherds found in the upper levels at Angel, which typically had been broken into smaller pieces by repeated plowing.

=== Lithics ===
Virtually all of the non-pottery artifacts recovered at Ellerbusch through 1977 were stone tools or pieces thereof; Green reports that 3,907 stone artifacts (out of a total of 7,379) were found at the site. Unfortunately, more than five out of every six were recovered by surface collection instead of excavation, demonstrating the substantial amount of damage done by plowing and natural erosion. More than 3,800 of the stone artifacts were chipped stone (either cores or smaller pieces), and three of every four chips were lithic flakes without any sign of modification after creation. Another 124 pieces were projectile points of a wide range of forms, as well as 164 items that appear to be fragments of other points. Other forms of identifiable chipped-stone tools recovered at Ellerbusch include knives, drills, scrapers, one shredder (a tool similar to a scraper, but used for tearing instead of scraping), and numerous flakes with signs of having once been parts of hoes. Ground stone artifacts were observed of types such as pestles, nutting stones, and hammerstones, as well as miscellaneous objects such as pieces of two Woodland gorgets, a single copper bead, and a small pipe of a form frequently found at Angel and similar Mississippian sites.

=== Houses ===
Among the portions of the site excavated in 1973 was the house that the Ellerbusches had revealed. The superimposition of certain features demonstrated that two houses had occupied the site, with one seemingly having been built immediately after the other's destruction; both were approximately the same size (22 by 19 feet (6.7 by 5.8 m) by 19 feet (5.8 m)) and were oriented in the same direction. Both houses appear to have relied on the structural support of vertical posts and supports located in wall trenches; only one pit (which appears to have been a hearth) was found in a house at the site. Another house site excavated in 1973 had been the site of three or four different houses in turn; besides its own postholes, the second house site is associated with ten nearby pits and a pile of stone chips of a type of chert comparable to what is commonly found in Harrison County to the east. Rather than being identical in form, the houses were either of two or three different types, and because no useful distinction between house types appears to have existed, it seems that the different types of houses were constructed at different times. Partial remains of other structures, including two other houses, remained at the site, but plowing had greatly reduced the amount of area with surviving features from these structures. All of the houses were generally rectangular in shape, with the sides being built first and the corners either being filled in later without support posts or left open as doorways; none of the sides of any of the houses showed openings that were likely to have been doorways. The presence of houses is the primary basis for Green's argument that Ellerbusch was a farming hamlet instead of a processing center for hunters: stone tools found at the site could have been used for animal processing, but the construction of houses at a site just a few miles away from Angel would have represented wasted effort for wide-roaming hunters but a worthwhile investment of time for sedentary farmers.

=== Other ===
A group of small pits was found at the site; while they could have been used for storage, these pits' small size likely precludes any purpose for them aside from refuse holes. Unusually for a Mississippian site, the houses appear to have been built simply on the surface of the ground; Ellerbusch shows no evidence of the common Mississippian practice of building houses on a specially prepared floor below the surface of the ground. The usefulness of the site for research purposes was hindered by a combination of two factors: because the site sits atop a hill, erosion from rainwater and modern plowing had destroyed most of its context by mixing artifacts from different periods, and because the soil was strongly acidic, one bone was the only significant survivor of all animal materials that had once been located at the site.

== Conclusions ==
=== Relationships with Angel ===
Ellerbusch's location near the Ohio River is typical of Angel Phase communities, which commonly occupied terraces above the floodplain of the Ohio or of other rivers. The inhabitants appear to have favored floodplains partly because of their productivity: uplands are more susceptible to erosion and tend to dry out more rapidly, and without the use of crop rotation or modern fertilizers, upland fields would be depleted in just a few growing seasons. Moreover, people of the Angel Phase typically used wood as fuel, and residents of a floodplain can find wood more easily than upland peoples by utilizing driftwood. Furthermore, riverside villagers have easier access to water for drinking and washing, and they could supplement their diet by fishing and hunting animals that came to drink at the river, rather than depending solely on the chase. While the Angels site was the premier settlement of the region, hamlets such as Ellerbusch were established for the sake of efficiency: had everyone lived at Angel, the time spent each day walking to distant fields would have been excessive, but by establishing villages amidst the fields, the people were able to use their time far more efficiently. Moreover, the upland area immediately surrounding the site was suitable for short-term cultivation, as Alford loess soil is easily cultivated and can be as fertile as floodplains. It seems that warfare was the only restraint on the further spread of Ellerbusch-type sites to a greater distance — because they were frequently in conflict with other peoples, the Angel Phase population needed to be able to take refuge at the stockaded Angel site instead of remaining at defenseless small villages. Consequently, Ellerbusch and related sites were more intensively occupied during what appear to have been periods of peace. While excavations at Ellerbusch could not be used to provide a conclusive interpretation of certain features at Angel, they permitted a better understanding of yet smaller sites.

=== Dating and classification ===
Two radiocarbon dates were realized for the site, placing the Mississippian occupation at points between AD 200–320 and 990–1110. While Green stated that the first was plainly an error, the second he saw as disputable: it seemed somewhat early but was comparable to other early Mississippian sites in the region. Later authors, including Green himself, have seen the third-century result as evidence for a Woodland period occupation of the site, rather than as an erroneous reading.

Green calls Ellerbusch a hamlet, a classification that he assigns to Angel sites with:

- Sizes between 0.5 acres (0.20 ha) and 1 acre (0.40 ha)
- Only a small number of artifacts on the surface
- Remains of houses
- Evidence of activities such as hunting, farming, and gathering
- An estimated population of ten to twenty-five people

Having defined Ellerbusch as a hamlet, he determined its population and used the resulting figure as his basis for estimating the population of other hamlets. Previous studies proposed that households at the culture's sites averaged five members, and evidence at Ellerbusch suggests that only two or three of its four houses were used at any given time. Because such a figure yields ten or fifteen residents in the site's ½-acre area, slightly larger populations have been proposed for hamlets with twice the area. Likewise, a hamlet's lack of extensive occupation (resulting in little cultural material on the surface) was defined from the small influence that its residents exercised on the surrounding terrain. Out of sixty-eight Angel Phase sites that were known in 1977, Green classified six as hamlets.

== Recognition ==
In early 1991, the Ellerbusch Site was listed on the National Register of Historic Places because of its significance as an important archaeological site. It is one of three Warrick County archaeological sites on the Register, along with a small part of the Angel site and the entirety of the Yankeetown site, located along the Ohio River to the southeast.

== See also ==
- Angel phase chiefdom
- List of archaeological sites on the National Register of Historic Places in Indiana
