= Annis Mound and Village site =

Archaeological site in Kentucky, US

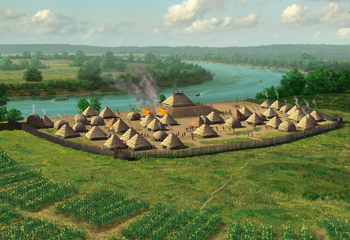
- Artist's conception of the Annis Mound and Village site circa 1250-1300 CE

- Location in Kentucky today
- 37°17′23.42″N 86°45′10.4″W
- Cultures: Middle Mississippian culture
- Location: Butler County, Kentucky, USA
- Region: Western Coal Field

History
- Built: 800 CE
- Abandoned: 1300 CE

Site notes
- Architectural styles: platform mound, palisade
- Annis Mound and Village site
- U.S. National Register of Historic Places
- Area: 9 acres (3.6 ha)
- NRHP reference No.: 85003182
- Added to NRHP: December 21, 1985
- Excavation dates: 1916, 1939–1940, 2002–2004
- Archaeologists: Clarence Bloomfield Moore, William Snyder Webb, Scott W Hammerstedt

The Annis Mound and Village site (15BT2, 15BT20, and 15BT21) is an American prehistoric Middle Mississippian culture archaeological site located on the bank of the Green River in Butler County, Kentucky, several miles northwest of Morgantown in the Big Bend region. It was occupied from about 800 CE to about 1300 CE.

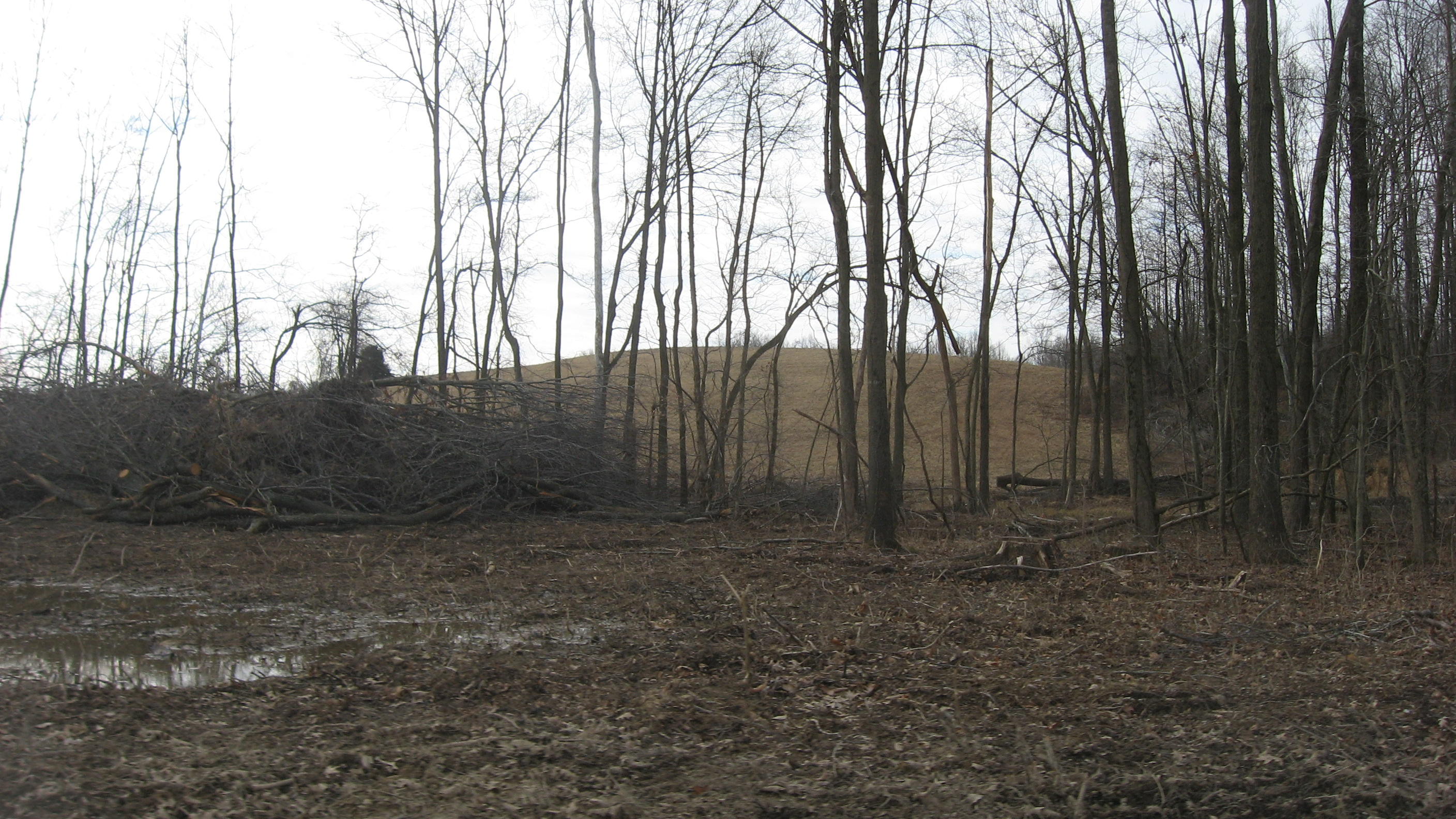
Annis Village site

The site consisted of a platform mound (15 BT 2) measuring 33.5 metres (110 ft) square by 3.7 metres (12 ft) in height with special use structures at its summit. It was surrounded by the village area (15 BT 20) which was situated north of the generally east to west course of the Green River at the sites location. The village featured domestic structures and several sequential iterations of an encircling defensive palisade of upright tree trunks. The palisade was built three different times in the site's history; each one larger than its predecessor and encircling an expanded village area. A bastion was discovered in the northwest corner of the last version of the palisade. Agriculture was based on the cultivation of maize as a staple of the diet. Ceramics found at the site were typical Mississippian culture pottery; although a few sherds of high status pottery from the Cahokia site were discovered during excavations of the platform mound summit structure.

The site also features a 1 metre (3.3 ft) in height 30 metres (98 ft) by 35 metres (115 ft) circular feature known as the Annis Sand Mound (15 BT 21) that dates from the Archaic period. This feature lies directly north of the village area and outside of the area encompassed by the palisade.

A 9 acres (3.6 ha) area at the site was listed on the National Register of Historic Places as "Annis Mound and Village Site" in 1985.

== See also ==
- Angel Mounds
- Carlston Annis Shell Mound
- Kincaid Mounds State Historic Site
- List of Mississippian sites
