= Angel phase chiefdom =

Mississippian polity in the lower Ohio Valley

Angel Chiefdom/Angel Phase Taarsite? Akansa?
- c. <1050–c. 1450
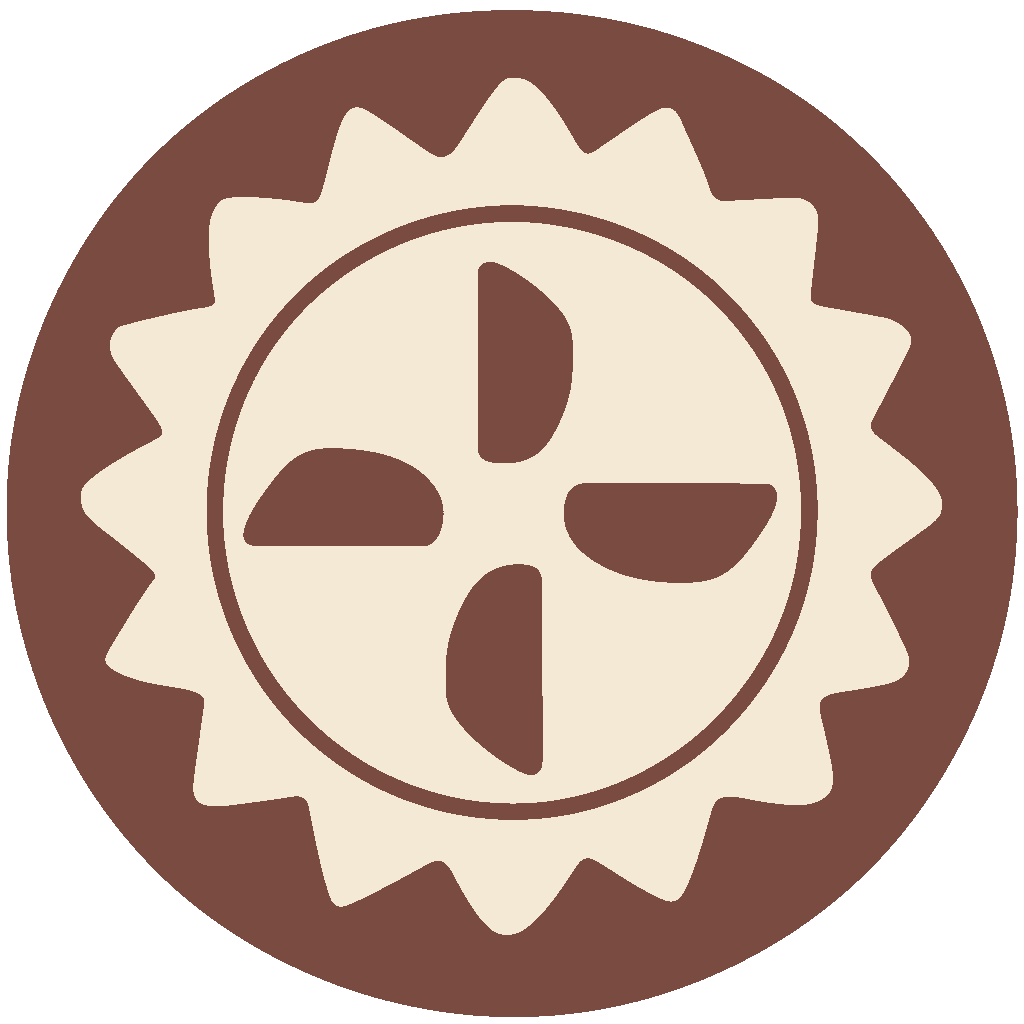
- Symbol found on Angel pottery, characteristic of their religion, their negative-painted pottery style, and possibly their government.

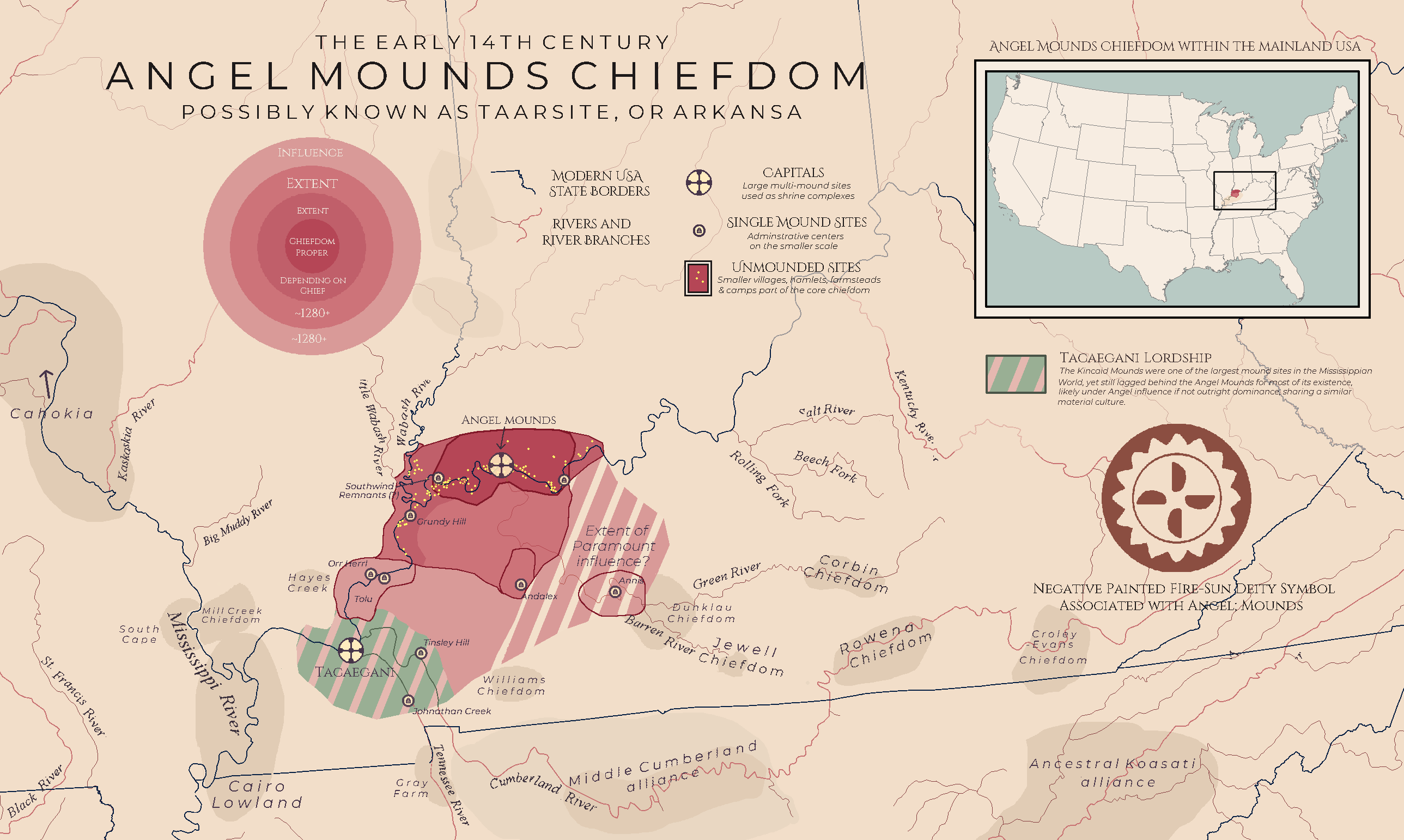
- Likely extent of the Angel Mounds Chiefdom in the Early 14th Century
- Status: Mississippian-culture micoship
- Location: Confluences of the Wabash, Mississippi, Ohio, Cumberland and Tennessee Rivers
- Capital: Angel Mounds
- Common languages: Shawnee?; Dhegihan Siouan?
- Demonym: Taarsite? Akansa?
- Government: Monarchy
- Great Sun
- Historical era: Mississippian culture
  - Established: c. <1050
  - Founding of the Angel Mounds Site: c. 1050
  - End of significant occupation of Angel Mounds: c. 1450
  - Disestablished: c. 1450
Succeeded by
Caborn-Welborn culture
Quapaw
Shawnee
Piankashaw
- Today part of: Indiana; Kentucky; Illinois

The Angel phase or Angel Mounds Chiefdom describes a 300–400-year old Mississippian polity in the central portions of the United States of America. Angel phase archaeological sites date from c. 1050 - 1350 CE and are located on the northern and southern sides of the Ohio River in southern Indiana, such as National Historic Landmark Angel Mounds near present-day Evansville. Additional sites directly associated with the Angel polity range from the mouth of Anderson River in Perry County, Indiana, west to the mouth of the Wabash in Posey County, Indiana. Angel is thought to be culturally related to major sites downriver in northwestern Kentucky such as Wickliffe Mounds and the Tolu Site, as well as Kincaid Mounds State Historic Site in Illinois.

== History ==
=== Founding of Angel Mounds and The Angel Axis (1000/1050-1200) ===
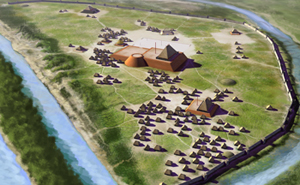
Angel Mounds

Angel Mounds was originally created as a Mississippian Shrine Complex, the Angel Mounds were likely built by multiple peoples influenced by the city of Cahokia. Locals returning from experiences in Cahokia, opportunistic Cahokians, and Cahokian missionaries hoping to spread the corn mother religion, all embarking in this new project. The mounds were built to align with the patterns in the sky for religious purposes. Winter Solstice sunrises, lunar movements, the rising of the milky way, alignments to the four-cornered cosmos based on the cardinal directions, made with calculations and formulas based in the Hopewell Era and Mississippian/Corn Mother astronomy. Astronomical mounds and earthworks continued to be rebuilt and elaborated upon throughout the centuries, legitimizing the rule of the Great Sun and the hereditary Mississippian elite.

This period is known as the Angel I phase. The Angel site itself was still being constructed, and a unified Angel polity had yet to be consolidated.

=== The Rise of Angel Mounds (1200-1325) ===
The unique alignments (principally the lunar alignment) at Angel is known as the "Angel Axis," and mounded towns (like Southwind, Andalex, Annis) could be associated with Angel based on the alignments of their mounds or religious structures to the Angel Axis. It was during this Angel II phase, between 1200 and 1325, that the Angel Mounds began establishing its dominance among Angel Phase towns. About one quarter, 24.48%, of all structures in associated towns, villages, and hamlets (known as the angel hinterland) during this period seem to be aligned to the Angel Axis.

Beginning in the mid to late 13th century, Angel Mounds began to exert power outside of the Ohio & Wabash rivers. Sites like Andalex on the Green River surged in the construction of structures and mounds aligned with the Angel Axis. At its peak, even the Annis Mound, even further down the Green River, had structures aligned with the Angel Axis.

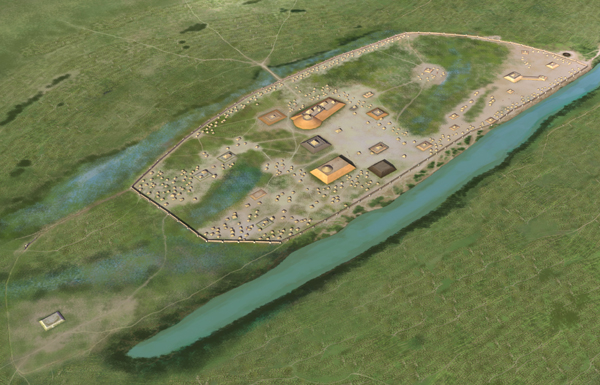
Kincaid Mounds c. 1300

The largest mound site in the region was Kincaid Mounds, likely a separate chiefdom. Kincaid was previously thought to have been smaller than Angel Mounds, and closely related, especially in terms of ceramics. However, more recent research indicates that Kincaid and Angel were more independent than previously thought, and that Kincaid was the larger of the two. Yet, Angel outlasted Kincaid, which was abandoned around 1400 CE.

The power and influence of the Angel Mounds is reflected in its prestige goods. Tools made from quarries in Tennessee, quarries in Illinois (related to Cahokia), and chunkey stones used in the game of chunkey (a signature of Cahokian influence). More minor goods were copper, hematite, galena and quartz crystals. Regionally, stone statues representing deities and ancestors were produced, religious rituals involving thousands of people would be held in the plaza of Angel Mounds, peaking in the 13th to early 14th century.

=== Decline and Reorganization (1450-1600) ===
Soil depletion, deforestation, climate change, combined with the collapse of Cahokia in the 14th century, would deal a heavy blow to the ruling lineage so reliant on Cahokian prestige. A slow hundred year long decline of elite power began, the population (probably) generally moving west to the confluence of the Wabash and Ohio, the Angel Mounds Lordship reorganizing into the Caborn-Welborn culture, which were possibly encountered by French explorers as the "Taarsite" nation. Maize in the diet was reduced, but trade routes kept their grand size, if not increased (due to the collapse of cahokia, prestige goods likely had to diversify). Arrowheads from the Pacaha/Nodena Phase further south in Arkansas, gorget-masks from up the Ohio river among the Fort Ancient Culture, artifacts from the new less agricultural occupiers of Illinois, and European goods became the new prestige goods for a new elite. Probably because of how diverse the prestige goods were, a centralized chiefdom didn't emerge again, rather the Caborn-Welborn is seen as a confederation of various groups and classes, elite and commoner alike.

== Angel phase assemblage ==
One of the most extensive Mississippian artifact assemblages in its region, the Angel phase collection consists of well over 2.5 million individually catalogued objects. The count is rising yearly with continued excavation and research. Characteristic to Angel phase mounds in particular, the assemblage is overwhelmingly ceramic, with vessels and pottery fragments occupying just under 70% of the total count, or more than 1.8 million sherds. (Hilgeman, 2000:25). Of this vast quantity, 98% are plain or decorated with relatively common designs. The common decorations such as cord marking and fabric impressing are very rare.

Chipped-stone artifacts and debris are uncommon at Angel phase mounds, consisting of less than 1% of all artifacts. Ground-stone artifacts are fewer, representing about one-seventh the frequency of their chipped counterparts. Animal remains are, however, a significant portion of the assemblage, with specimen counts attributing about 20%.

From a regional perspective, certain patterns and comparisons can be observed between other assemblages and among time periods. First, the simplicity or plainness of the Angel collection is similar to comparable assemblages from the Tennessee-Cumberland region. It is considered more plain than other Ohio-Mississippi confluence assemblages. Second, there is a trend toward greater plainness as time progresses. From early Angel 2 phase to late Angel 3 phase, the percentage of decorated sherds relative to all sherds declined from 3% to 0.6%. This trend is in line with regional trends in Tennessee-Cumberland and Western Kentucky assemblages that deemphasized painting as a mode of decoration from prior to 1200 CE compared to afterward. Ramey Incised sherds occur rarely in the earlier period, while the appearance elsewhere of a Parkin Punctate sherd indicates a later period.

== Spatiotemporal distribution ==
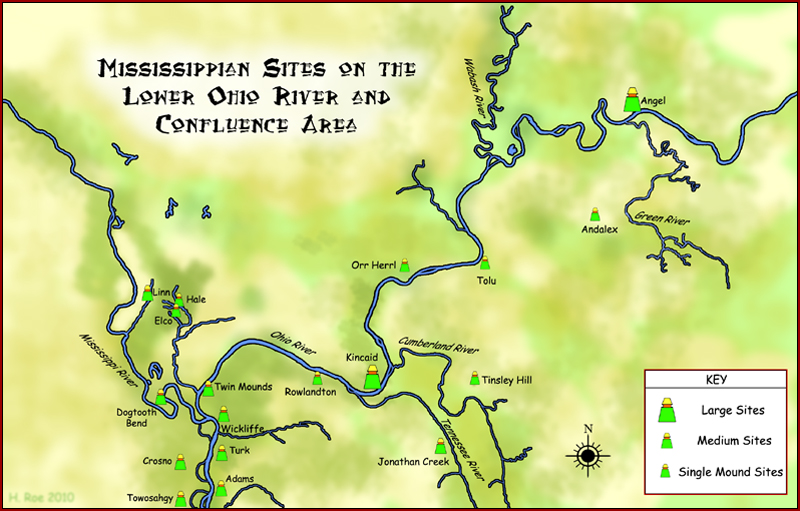
Mississippian sites on the Lower Ohio River

In the lower Ohio River valley in Illinois, Kentucky, and Indiana, the Mississippian-culture towns of Kincaid, Wickliffe, Tolu, and Angel Mounds have been grouped together into a "Kincaid focus" set, due to similarities in pottery assemblages and site plans. Most striking are the comparisons between the Kincaid and Angel sites, which include analogous site plans, stylistic similarities in artifacts, and geographic proximity. These connections have led some experts to hypothesize that the builders and residents were of the same society, although more recent research has made that idea less probable.

The 300-400 year span in which these types of artifacts and sites are found is called the "Angel phase". It is broken up into three subphases:

- Jonathan Creek (1000/1100-1200CE),
- Angelly (1200-1300CE), and
- Tinsley Hill (1300-1450CE) (30).

All four mound sites (above) include painted and incised sherds that are very rare, ranging from less than one percent near Kincaid to about three or four percent of the assemblage at Wickliffe. Some common pottery styles found in these sites include: Angel Negative Painted, Kincaid Negative Painted, and Matthews Incised (32). This pottery is shell tempered and ranges from the smoothed surface and coarser temper of Mississippi Ware to the more polished surface and finer temper of Bell Ware (31).

== Regional manifestations ==
=== Chronology ===
Many of the structures in the site were built in the early Angel 2 phase (1200 to 1325). According to the stratigraphy of midden deposits, this was the earliest Middle Mississippian occupation of Angel. During this phase at Angel, pottery design indicates that this was the same time period as when Middle Wickliffe transitioned to Late Wickliffe phase.

The proposed Angel 1 phase (Stephan–Steinkamp phase, 1100 to 1200?), is represented only by pottery sherds in the vicinity of, but not in, the Angel Mounds site. Mound A was constructed in the early 13th century, during the Angel 2 phase. The pottery found at the top of the mound dates to only Angel 2. This suggests that the mound was no longer in use for Angel 3 (1325 to 1450).

According to pottery deposits throughout the Angel site, only half the area was occupied for Angel 2. The dating of human remains buried at the site and Angel 3 pottery suggest that the majority of the site (north, west, east, and interior areas) was in use during Angel 3. There appeared to be more activity and a more populous occupation during Angel 3 than during Angel 2.

Archaeologists theorize that by 1450 CE with the collapse of the Angel chiefdom, many of the Angel people had relocated downriver to the confluence of the Ohio and Wabash rivers. A new Late Mississippian cultural group subsequently emerged and are known as the Caborn-Welborn culture.

== History of research ==
The history of research concerning Angel phase and Mississippian archaeology is chiefly focused on the study of shell-tempered pottery. The first accounts of the process of shell-tempered pottery in the Southeast were described by Dumont. In his historical account, Dumont described how women were in charge of the process. He described in rich detail the skill and elements involved in the creation of shell-tempered pottery. Pottery of the region has been studied by archeologists both to define chronology of sites and to understand cultural relationships. Fay-Cooper Cole, et al. (1951:229) grouped the lower Ohio Valley Mississippian towns of Angel, Kincaid, Tolu and Wickliffe into the "Kincaid focus". The geographic distribution of Angel and Caborn-Welborn settlements, their classifications, and their relationships with each other were examined by Thomas J. Green and Cheryl Ann Munson in a series of publications; the key Angel phase sites in their work were Angel and Ellerbusch, a small site near Angel.

Radiocarbon dating was used together with analysis of regional trends of assemblages to fill in aspects of the temporal range of the Angel Mounds site. As the discipline of archaeology changed, the focus of research in Mississippian archaeology changed with it. Chronology by seriation became an essential step towards answering more complex questions, instead of being only the final result of a study.
