= Tolu Site =

Prehistoric archeological site

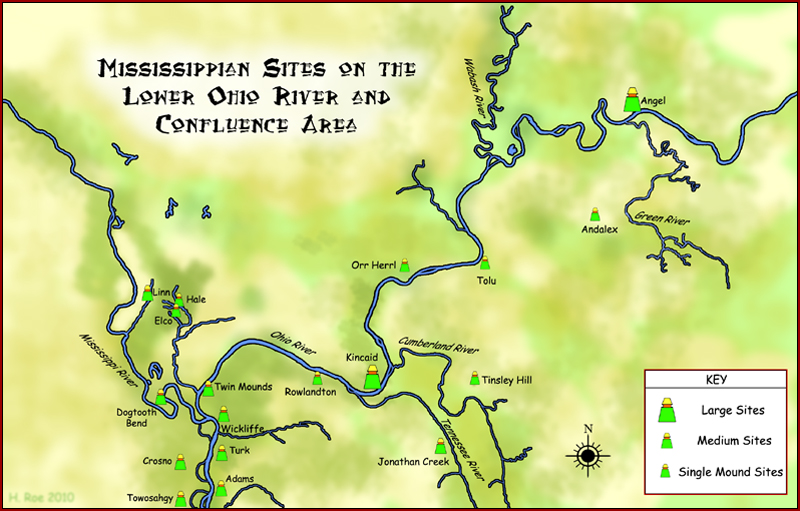
- Mississippian sites on the Lower Ohio River

- Location within Kentucky today
- 37°26′14″N 88°15′6″W
- Cultures: Mississippian culture
- Location: Tolu, Crittenden County, Kentucky, United States
- Region: Pennyroyal Plateau

History
- Built: 1200 CE

Site notes
- Architectural style: Platform mounds
- Archaeologists: W.S. Webb, William D. Funkhouser

The Tolu Site (15 CN 1) is a prehistoric archeological site of the Mississippian culture near the unincorporated community of Tolu, Crittenden County, Kentucky, United States. It was built and occupied between 1200 and 1450 CE. No carbon dating has been performed at the site, but analysis of pottery styles suggest its major habitation period was 1200 to 1300 CE. The site originally had three mounds, a burial mound, a substructure platform mound and one other of undetermined function. It was excavated in 1930 by W.S. Webb and William D. Funkhouser.

Tolu Site is part of the Angel phase of the Mississippian period. Because of similarities among the following sites in their styles of pottery and construction of communities, it is also considered part of the "Kincaid Set", together with Angel Mounds in Indiana and Kincaid Mounds in Illinois, and Wickliffe Mounds in far western Kentucky.

In May 1954 a stone statue carved from greyish white fluorite was found by a local farmer while plowing a field a few miles west of Tolu. It is considered to be one of the most detailed examples of Mississippian stone statuary ever found. The statue is the only example of this type of Native American artwork to have a representation of a beaded forelock, a hairstyle very prominent in other Mississippian artwork, most notably engraved mussel shells.

== See also ==
- Annis Mound and Village Site
- Obion Mounds
- Prather Site
- Towosahgy State Historic Site
