= Mabel Cook Cole =

American anthropologist

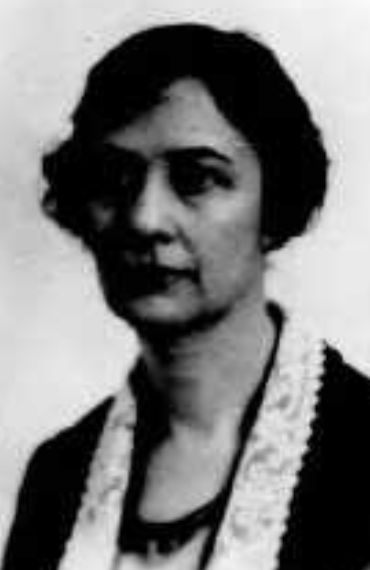
- Mabel Cook Cole, from her 1922 passport application
- Born: April 18, 1880; Plano, Illinois, U.S.
- Died: November 23, 1977 (aged 97); Pomona, California, U.S.
- Occupations: Writer, anthropologist
- Spouse: Fay-Cooper Cole
- Writing career
- Genres: Children's literature; also Philippine anthropology topics

Mabel Cook Cole (April 18, 1880 – November 23, 1977) was an American writer and anthropologist. She specialized in the study of ancient humans, and in studying the people of the Philippines and Malaysia.

== Early life and education ==
Mabel Elizabeth Cook was born in Plano, Illinois, the daughter of Amer Brewer Cook and Ella Augusta Webster Cook. She graduated from Plano High School, and in 1903 from Northwestern University.

== Career ==
Cole taught anthropology courses at Cornell University. She studied folk culture and stories in the Philippines and Malaysia, and made recordings of songs and spoken tales. She also assisted her husband Fay-Cooper Cole in research, and in writing about their findings. She was a member of the P.E.O. Sisterhood philanthropic organization, the Society of Women Geographers, and the National League of American Pen Women. The Coles retired to California in 1948.

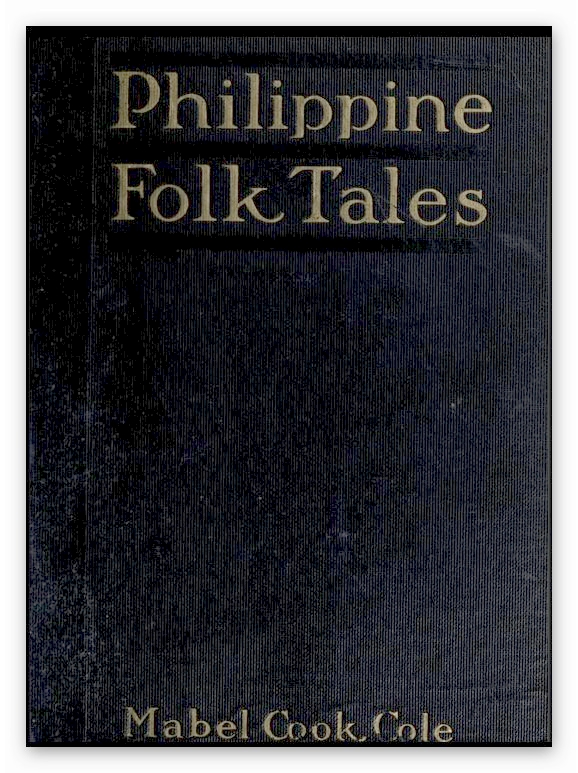
Cover of Mabel Cook Cole, Philippine Folk Tales (1916)

== Publications ==
Cole's Philippine Folk Tales (1916) were "literary retellings with the aim of making acceptable narratives", according to one review.

- Philippine Folk Tales (1916)
- "Homeless Husbands" (1924)
- Savage Gentlemen (1929, memoir)
- "The Island of Nias, at the edge of the world" (1931)
- The Story of Man (1938, with Fay-Cooper Cole)
- The Story of Primitive Man (1940, with Fay-Cooper Cole)

== Personal life ==
Cook married fellow anthropologist Fay-Cooper Cole. They had one child, Lamont. Her husband died in 1961, and Cole died in 1977, at the age of 97, in Pomona, California.
