= Angel Mounds =

Archaeological site in Indiana

- U.S. National Register of Historic Places
- U.S. National Historic Landmark
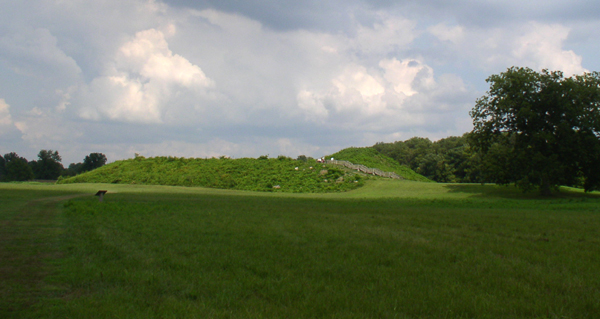
- Mound A, Angel Mound Site, Evansville, Indiana.

- Location within Indiana Location within the United States
- Nearest city: Evansville; Newburg
- Coordinates: 37°56′33″N 87°27′26″W
- NRHP reference No.: 66000124

Significant dates
- Added to NRHP: October 15, 1966
- Designated NHL: January 29, 1964

Angel Mounds State Historic Site (12 VG 1), an expression of the Mississippian culture, is an archaeological site managed by the Indiana State Museum and Historic Sites that includes more than 600 acres (240 hectares) of land about 8 miles (13 km) southeast of present-day Evansville, in Vanderburgh and Warrick counties in Indiana, United States. The large residential and agricultural community was constructed and inhabited from AD 1100 to AD 1450, and served as the political, cultural, and economic center of the Angel chiefdom. It extended within 120 miles (190 km) of the Ohio River valley to the Green River in present-day Kentucky. The town had as many as 1,000 inhabitants inside the walls at its peak, and included a complex of thirteen earthen mounds, hundreds of home sites, a palisade (stockade), and other structures.

Designated a National Historic Landmark in 1964, the property also includes an interpretive center, recreations of Mississippian structures, a replica of a 1939 Works Projects Administration archaeology laboratory, and a 500-acre (200-hectare) area away from the archaeological site that is a nature preserve. The historic site continues to preserve and relate the story of pre-contact Middle Mississippian indigenous culture on the Ohio River.

The site is named after the Angel family, who in 1852 began purchasing the farmland on which the archaeological site is located. In 1938, the Indiana Historical Society, with funding from Eli Lilly, purchased 480 acres (190 hectares) of property to preserve it and to use it for long-term archaeological research. From 1939 to 1942, the Works Progress Administration employed more than 250 workers to excavate 120,000 square feet (11,000 m^{2}) of the site, which resulted in the recording and processing of 2.3 million archaeological items. After excavation was temporarily halted during World War II, work resumed in 1945 as part of the Indiana University Archaeology Field School during the summer months. In 1946, the Indiana Historical Society transferred ownership of the site to the State of Indiana. It manages the site through the Indiana State Museum. Archaeological research on Angel Mounds, once conducted through the Glenn A. Black Laboratory of Archaeology, is now overseen by the IU Museum of Archaeology and Anthropology at Indiana University Bloomington.

== History ==
=== Origins ===
For thousands of years, the area that was later organized as the eastern United States was home to a succession of native groups who settled near the rivers and used them for travel and trade. The widespread Mississippian culture, which is named in reference to its geographical origins along the Mississippi River valley and its tributaries, developed around AD 900. This culture eventually extended as far west as Oklahoma, as far north as the present-day suburbs of Saint Louis, Missouri, in southwestern Illinois, and ranging east into the Southeastern Woodlands, to present-day North Carolina and as far south as present-day Mississippi.

=== Site development and decline ===
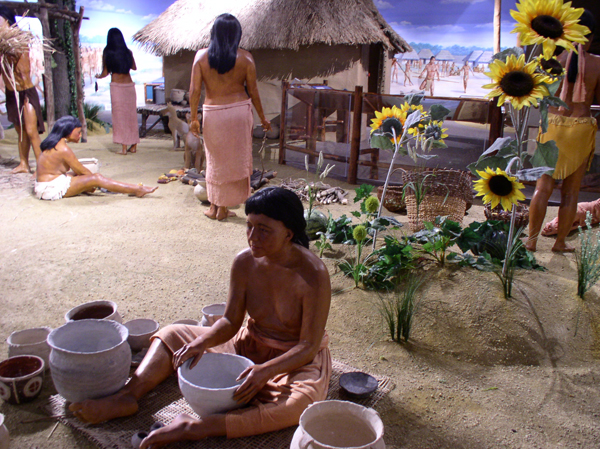
Pottery making in diorama at museum at Angel

The people of the Middle Mississippian culture built and lived in a community in what became southwestern Indiana around AD 1100 and remained there until AD 1450, a period that Marjory Honerkamp defined in the 1970s as the Angel phase. The Angel phase and the Mississippian culture town are named after the Angel family, who in 1852 began purchasing farmland that included the archaeological site.

Archeologist Sherri Hilgeman and others have used the distinctive pottery produced at the Angel site and in other satellite communities in this section of the Ohio River valley to define the Angel phase as the middle period between the Emergent Mississippian Yankeetown phase (AD 750 to AD 1000) and the Terminal Mississippian Caborn-Wellborn phase (AD 1400 to AD 1700).

The Angel chiefdom (a simple hierarchy led by a chief) was the regional trading center in a group of communities within 12 miles (19 km) of the Ohio River valley; it extended as far as the Green River in present-day Kentucky. The large residential and agricultural community was also the political, cultural, and economic center of the chiefdom, whose residents traded with other chiefdoms and peoples along the Ohio and Mississippi rivers. The Angel community primarily inhabited an area bounded by the Ohio River to the south, the White River and its East Fork to the north, the Wabash River to the west, and the Anderson River to the east. Archaeologists have inferred that the smaller communities (villages, hamlets, farmsteads and camp sites) were politically subordinate to the main Angel site. Continuing excavations at the site have revealed new elements of the complex society.

Laborers built the main Angel site sometime after AD 1000. They also established the surrounding villages and farming areas along the Ohio River and engaged in hunting and farming on the rich bottom lands. In addition, the Mississippian culture is known for its earthen mounds, designed in shapes including platform, conical, and ridgetop (as also seen at the largest center, Cahokia in present-day southern Illinois). Working with a variety of soils to create a stable mass, the Mississippian people built major earthworks at the Angel site. The community eventually covered about 100 acres (40 hectares) and included thirteen mounds near the Ohio River. Some of these mounds were built for ceremonial and cosmological purposes. In addition to the mounds, the Mississippians constructed structures and a defensive palisade (stockade) made of wattle and daub with 12-foot (3.7 m) walls and punctuated with bastions. This settlement was the largest-known town of its time in what became present-day Indiana. Scholars believe the town may have had as many as 1,000 inhabitants at its peak, which Indiana archeologist Glenn Albert Black estimated to be about 200 households.

Archaeologists believe that the Angel community existed from around AD 1100 to around AD 1450, although estimates for the site vary from AD 1000 to AD 1600. Carbon dating of the community indicate it was developed as early as AD 1200 and as late as AD 1500.

The Mississippian people abandoned the Angel site long before European contact; however, it is not known for certain why the Angel civilization declined. Scholars have speculated that it was potentially due to environmental factors, such as an extended regional drought that reduced the maize (corn) surpluses, and resulted in increasingly scarce natural resources that had once enabled the concentration of population. In addition, the people may have been overhunting, and reducing forests through the consumption of wood for constructing buildings and making fires. Archaeologists also theorize that with the collapse of the Angel chiefdom by AD 1450, many of the site's inhabitants relocated downriver to the confluence of the Ohio and Wabash rivers. A separate Late Mississippian cultural group subsequently emerged that archeologists named the Terminal Mississippian Caborn-Welborn phase (AD 1400 to AD 1700).

=== Subsequent settlement ===
Angel Mounds scholars believe that the Mississippians abandoned the site by AD 1400, and the Ohio River valley by AD 1650. In the eighteenth and nineteenth centuries, groups of other native peoples, such as the Shawnee, the Miami, and other historical tribes moved into the Ohio River valley from the east over the next 150 years. European explorers and traders subsequently arrived in the area. Anglo-American settlers who migrated to the area from the east and south remained to farm the land. Both the Native Americans and other settlers were attracted by the rich soil and temperate growing season.

Mathias Angel (1819–1899) was among these settlers. In 1852 he began purchasing farmland that also included the archaeological site. The Angel Mounds Historic Site is named after the Angel family and their descendants.

=== Site acquisition ===
In May 1931, Warren K. Moorehead, a nationally known archaeologist from Ohio State University and the Peabody Foundation; Eli Lilly, who became president of Eli Lilly and Company in 1932 and served as the president of the Indiana Historical Society from 1932 to 1947; and Glenn A. Black and E. Y. Guernsey, Society employees and archaeologists, visited the Angel site as part of a tour to assess Indiana's archaeological sites. In a May 1931 letter to Lilly, Moorehead encouraged him to acquire Angel Mounds for he thought it "of the greatest importance." Black, who served as the Society's director of archaeology and from 1939 to 1964 supervised excavation and field schools at the Angel site, thought that the mounds would provide an opportunity to conduct a long-term study of a single archaeological site. Although individuals had been surveying the area and digging at the Angel site prior to the beginning of its official excavation in 1939, the archaeological findings were not properly documented. Some individuals also came to the site simply to collect relics.

In 1938, the Indiana Historical Society purchased 480 acres (190 hectares) of property from the Angel family descendants and others to protect the archaeological site from destruction. The mounds were in danger of being destroyed due to construction of a planned levee and real estate development. Eli Lilly in his role as a philanthropist interested in Indiana's prehistory, provided the funds for the purchase.

=== Early excavation ===
Initial efforts in 1938–39 focused on surveying and clearing the main archaeological site and an outlying camp. From 1939 to 1942, as a project financed by President Franklin D. Roosevelt's New Deal, the Works Projects Administration employed more than 250 workers under the direction of Indiana archeologist Glenn A. Black to excavate 120,000 square feet (11,000 m^{2}) of the site. The men hired were inexperienced in archaeological field methods, so Black adapted standardized forms utilized by the University of Chicago under Fay-Cooper Cole and Thorne Deuel. These efforts resulted in the recording and processing of 2.3 million archaeological items. These WPA excavations focused largely on habitation areas, like the large village site, and less on the mounds in order to better understand daily life of the Mississippian peoples. Excavation was temporarily halted during World War II, but resumed in 1945 as part of the Indiana University Archaeology Field School during the summer months.

In 1946, the Indiana Historical Society transferred ownership of the property to the State of Indiana, but retained the rights to excavate the site. Black remained on the property as its caretaker. Between 1958 and 1962, two National Science Foundation grants provided financial support to assess geophysical applications at the site, including use of a proton magnetometer to trace segments of the site's palisade (stockade) walls that were not visible from the surface. This project, which extended the work begun by the University of Oxford's Research Laboratory for Archaeology and the History of Art, was one of the "first comprehensive tests in the Americas" to assess the instrument's potential on a New World site.

=== State historic site ===
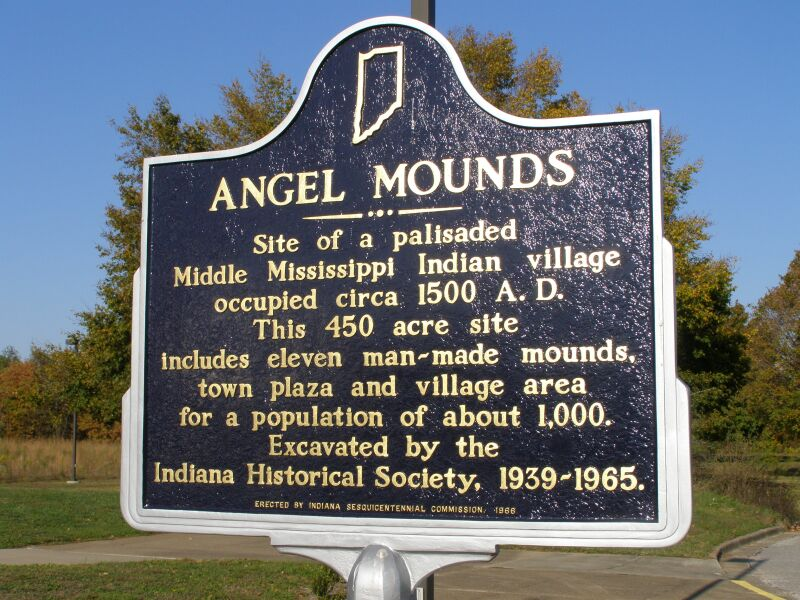
Signage for Angel Mounds State Historic Site in Indiana

Angel Mounds was declared a National Historic Landmark in 1964, the same year that the Indiana Historical Society transferred its archeological excavation rights to Indiana University. The site's original purchase was later augmented by Elda Clayton Herts's donation of 20 acres (8.1 hectares) containing an early Woodland period mound.

The Indiana State Museum and Historic Sites is the present-day manager of the site. Research on Angel Mounds is conducted through the Glenn A. Black Laboratory of Archaeology, founded in 1965 at Indiana University Bloomington and named in honor of Glenn Albert Black, the archaeologist who conducted excavations at Angel Mounds from 1939 to 1964, and brought the site to national attention. Since 1945, Indiana University has continued to conduct an archaeology field school at the site during the summer months.

The Angel Mounds State Historic Site, a National Historic Landmark, is recognized as one of the best-preserved prehistoric sites in the United States for understanding Middle Mississippian culture along the Ohio River, and Native American culture before contact with Europeans. The site occupies more than 600 acres (240 hectares) of land and includes an interpretive center (opened to the public in 1972), recreations of Mississippian structures, and a replica of a 1939 WPA archaeology laboratory. A 500-acre (200-hectare) area of the property, which does not include the archaeological site, has a nature preserve and recreational trails. Archaeological excavations at Angel Mounds State Historic Site continue through Indiana University's field school. The interpretive center closed in 2022 and reopened in 2024 after a $6.5 million improvement which included collaboration with the Miami Tribe of Oklahoma, Osage Nation, Quapaw Nation, Shawnee, and others.

== Setting ==
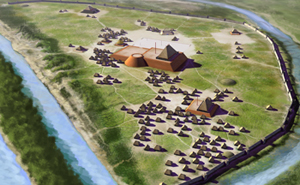
Artists conception of the Angel Mounds site

The Angel site was the regional trading center in a group of associated settlements and hamlets within a 70-mile (110 km) radius. The town overlooks the Ohio River, which borders the town's south side, and includes terraced land and earthen mounds built above the river's flood plain. The main site is close to agricultural fields and is shielded from the river by what is known in the present-day as Three Mile Island. The community faces south across a narrow channel toward the island and what is present-day Kentucky. The channel and slough, which existed during the time that the archaeological site was inhabited, created a quiet backwater that surrounded the town on the north, east, and west sides. The slough and channel to the Ohio River provided easy transit for canoes, as well as a source for freshwater fishing, potable water, and bathing.

(Until nearly the end of the nineteenth century, the Ohio River was clear and potable. In the mid-twentieth century, the channel was known as an excellent fishing area.) When the site was first settled, the slough was deeper and the Mississippian people kept it cleared of brush and trees; however, by 1939, when official excavation of the Angel site began, the stream had dried-up and the channel had eroded, providing a land surface that was often stable enough to walk across.

The Mississippians found the site along the Ohio River ideal for agricultural purposes. Annual spring floods regularly replenished the nutrients in the soil and allowed cultivation of crops that included maize (corn), beans, and squash. The fertile soil enabled production of surplus crops, which the Mississippian people used for trade and to support a higher density population that developed artisan and craft specialties such as pottery.

== Mounds ==
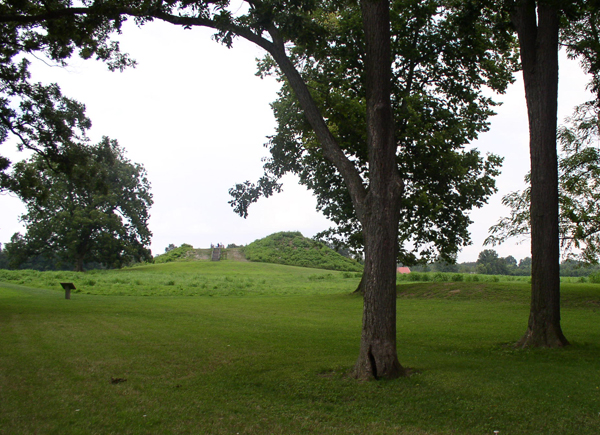
View of Mound A, narrow end

The site includes six large platform mounds (Mounds A through F), five smaller mounds (Mounds H through L), and at least one large plaza. Mound G, which is older than the others, may not have been part of the Angel phase group. A defensive palisade with bastions nearly surrounded the approximately 100-acre (40-hectare) town. Mounds A (Central Mound), E, and F (Temple Mound), the largest mounds at the site, are truncate pyramidal earthen structures with either a square or rectangular base. Mound A and Mound F, constructed about AD 1050 to 1100, were used until the Mississippians abandoned the site about AD 1400, and then burned. Mounds I and K may have been constructed over older mound structures.

=== Mound A (Central Mound) ===
Mound A, also called the Central Mound, is the largest and highest (44 feet (13 m)) in the complex. It also among the largest prehistoric structures in the eastern United States. Central Mound contains three levels with a smaller conical mound in the southeast corner of the upper level. The base mound is 644 feet (196 m) long and 335 feet (102 m) wide.

Laborers carried 67,785 cubic yards (51,825 m^{3}) of dirt in baskets from the chute (a waterway along the south side of the town) to create the mound. The lower terrace, measuring 100 feet (30 m) by 100 feet (30 m), is on the south side of the mound. The upper terrace is 28 feet (8.5 m) above the surrounding area. Based on reports from early European explorers in the southeastern United States who encountered active Mississippian culture villages, this mound was likely the residence of the hereditary chief of the town and the surrounding communities. (It is generally believed that upper-class members of society would live on the highest mounds, while lower-class members inhabited smaller living spaces.) The State of Indiana constructed a modern stairway ascending the mound to protect it from erosion of pedestrian traffic. Archeological evidence suggests there may have been a log stairway in prehistoric times.

=== Mound F (Temple Mound) ===
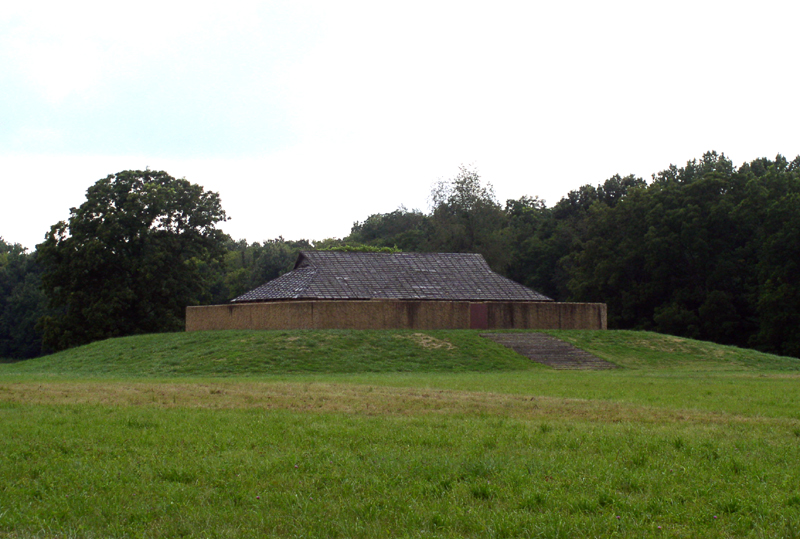
Artist's reconstruction of Mound F and temple structure

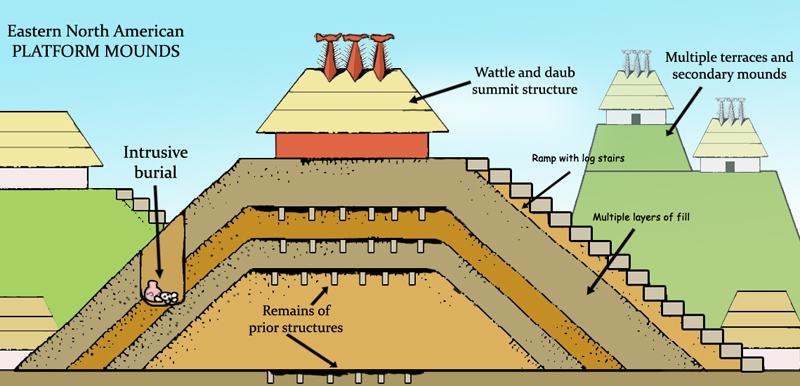
A diagram showing the multiple construction layers of platform mounds

Mound F, the only mound that is completed excavated, was a platform mound measuring 235 feet (72 m) by 239 feet (73 m) and 14.0 feet (4.26 m) in height. Excavations showed that the mound was built in several construction phases with different occupation episodes on the different levels. The episodes of occupation include a structure at the original ground layer, followed by another structure on what is known as "occupational layer 2". This was then covered by the "inner mound surface", a layer of mound fill and more structures. The structures on this level seemed to have been domestic in nature. The next layer of mound fill is known as the "primary mound surface" and was surmounted by a large rectangular structure with at least two rooms and anterooms, or porticoes, appended to it. The final layer of mound fill is the "secondary mound surface". Due to the amount of historic period soil disturbance on the summit it is unclear if any structures sat atop this phase. Mound F was destroyed during the process of its excavation and subsequently re-constructed to show its original appearance. The reconstruction features a temple structure surrounded by a palisade and stairs leading to the summit.

=== Mound E ===
Mound E, the third largest mound, measures 160 feet (49 m) by 140 feet (43 m). Its upper platform is 45 feet (14 m) by 40 feet (12 m). Because this earthen mound was never cultivated, it is considered to be the site's best example of a truncate mound.

== Palisade ==
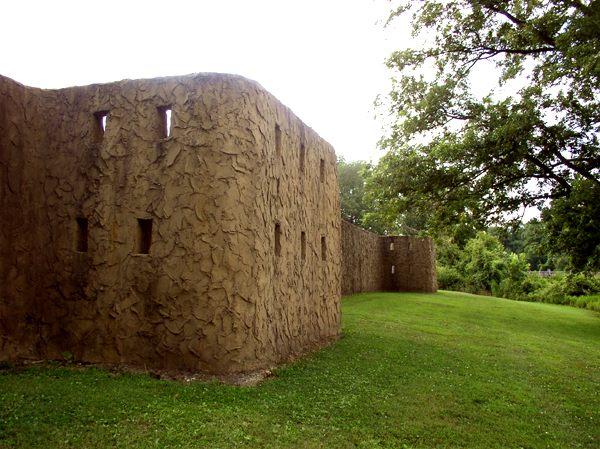
A section of reconstructed palisade at Angel Mounds

Archaeological excavation revealed a set of two palisade (stockade) walls. The outer palisade surrounded the perimeter of the town with the Ohio River acting as a barrier on the south side. An inner palisade bisected the interior of the site. An entrance to the town was believed to have been on southwest corner of the palisade, based on archaeological findings at that location. Parallel to the stockade walls, another barrier (similar to a picket fence) was set 14 feet (4.3 m) outside the stockade. It was designed to slow attackers as they came into range.

A reconstruction of part of the stockade, based on archeological evidence, was made in 1972. The reconstructed walls are 12 feet (3.7 m) high and have wooden posts set 4 feet (1.2 m) deep into a narrow trench. The walls and posts are covered with wattle and daub (a loose weaving of sticks covered with a mud-and-grass plaster). Defensive bastions along the stockade walls were also reconstructed. The original inhabitants set the bastions about 120 feet (37 m) apart and projecting 10 feet (3.0 m) to 11 feet (3.4 m) from the wall. The distance between each bastion allowed defenders using arrows or lances to protect the walls from direct attack.

== Other structural features ==
When residences were no longer "serviceable," the Mississippians burned the structures and constructed a new one over the ashes. Indiana archaeologist Glenn A. Black posited that walls were covered in cane and plastered with mud and straw. Roof composition is uncertain, but Black thought they were grass thatch. Two construction methods were used, one for summer and another for winter. Two circular structures uncovered at the site are likely to have been sweat lodges (similar in use to present-day saunas). Or, they may have been used for meetings. The Mississippians also constructed what is believed to have been a public plaza between Mound A and Mound F.

== Artifacts ==
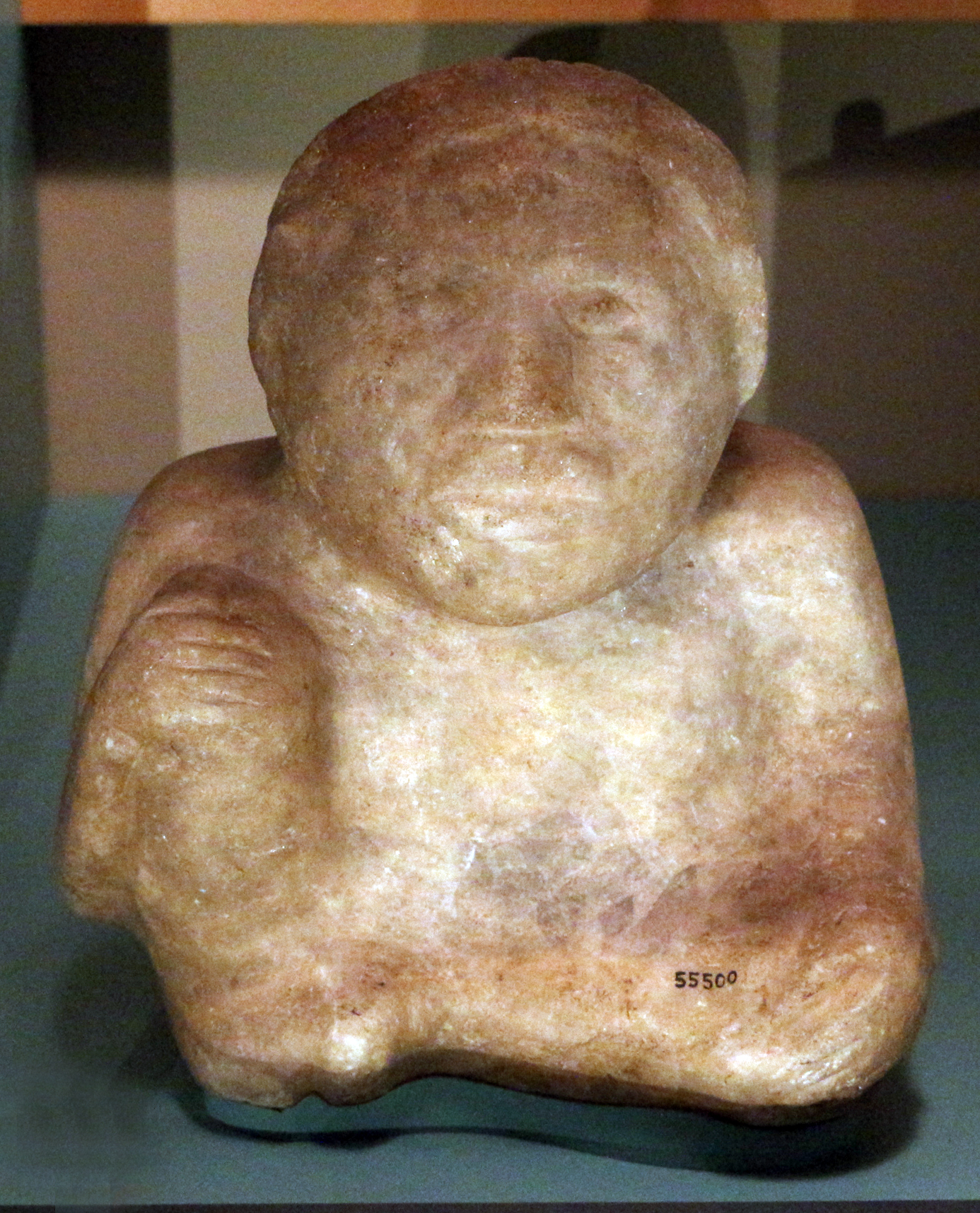
The Ware Mounds Site statue from Union County, Illinois

About 2.4 million artifacts were collected during excavations conducted by WPA workers from 1939 to 1942. One of the most significant artifacts uncovered at the Angel site was a carved Mississippian culture stone statue of a seated man, which was found at Mound F in November 1940. The fluorite artifact is 8.5 inches (22 cm) tall and weighs 11.5 pounds (5.2 kg). Similar rare fluorite statues have been found at the Obion Mounds site in Henry County, Tennessee and the Ware Mounds site in Union County, Illinois.

Mississippian tools and weapons found at the site were made of igneous rock, sedimentary rock (sandstone), slate, shale, diorite, or cannel coal. Metalwork objects were very rare. Based on research and artifacts discovered at the Angel site, it is believed that the Mississippians used bone fishhooks and nets made of cord to catch mollusks and freshwater fish (catfish and drumfish). Spears with projectile points were used to hunt small game. Antler, animal and bird bone, shells, and animal teeth were also found.

Of the nearly 2 million sherds of pottery found at the site, 4,569 of them were of the negative-painted type. Textile patterns made inside of the pottery are a trait unique to the Angel site. In May 2006, researchers discovered a probable pottery-making workshop at the site. This discovery further revealed the artistic skills of the Mississippian culture people. Pottery tools and masses of prepared, slightly fired clay pieces were also found during the season's excavation. It appeared to be a type of production-line process, with the works awaiting finishing and firing as bowls, jars or figures.

The archaeological objects and associated records from Angel Mounds are curated and cared for at the IU Museum of Archaeology and Anthropology in Bloomington, Indiana. The most recent preservation effort came through a three-year Save America's Treasures grant administered by the National Park Service and the Institute of Museum and Library Services to rehouse the Angel Mounds collections.

== Kincaid Focus ==
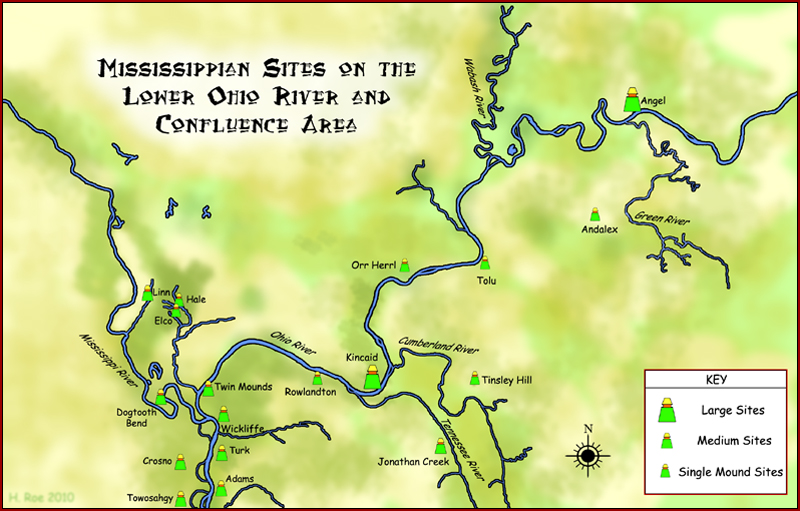
Mississippian sites on the Lower Ohio River

In the lower Ohio River valley in Illinois, Kentucky, and Indiana, the Mississippian-culture towns of Kincaid, Wickliffe, Tolu, and Angel Mounds have been grouped together into a "Kincaid Focus" set, due to similarities in pottery assemblages and site plans. Most striking are the comparisons between the Kincaid and Angel sites, which include analogous site plans, stylistic similarities in artifacts, and geographic proximity. These connections have led some scholars to hypothesize that the builders and residents were of the same society.

The 300- to 400-year span in which these types of artifacts and sites are found is called the "Angel phase". It is divided into three subphases:

Subphases	Dates
Jonathan Creek	1000–1100/1200
Angelly	1200–1300
Tinsley Hill	1300–1450

Rare painted and incised sherds of Mississippian culture pottery have been found at all four sites, ranging from less than one percent near Kincaid to about three or four percent of the assemblage at Wickliffe. Some common pottery styles found in these sites include: Angel Negative Painted, Kincaid Negative Painted, and Matthews Incised. This pottery is shell-tempered and ranges from the smoothed surface and coarser temper of Mississippi Ware to the more polished surface and finer temper of Bell Ware.

== Burials ==
During the WPA excavation of the site (1939 to 1942), more than 300 burials were uncovered, most of them in the site's east village. Other burials were found on the sides of Mound F, at Mound I, or near the palisade walls. Although there are grave sites found throughout the Angel site, the remains of infant children were "occasionally found beneath the floors of homes."

The WPA-funded excavations were responsible for the largest disinterment, though with the following decades a total of 725 individuals and around 15,000 funerary objects were removed from their burials. In March 2021, eight federally-recognized Tribal Nations with affiliation to Angel Mounds (Delaware Nation, Delaware Tribe of Indians, Miami Tribe of Oklahoma, Peoria Tribe of Indians of Oklahoma, Quapaw Nation, Absentee Shawnee Tribe of Indians of Oklahoma, Eastern Shawnee Tribe of Oklahoma, Shawnee Tribe), Indiana University Office of the Native American Graves Protection & Repatriation Act (NAGPRA), and the Indiana State Museum reburied over 700 ancestors at Angel Mounds, one of the largest repatriations ever completed in the United States at the time.

== See also ==
- Angel phase
- Mississippian culture
- Caborn-Welborn culture
- Southeastern Ceremonial Complex
- Mississippian stone statuary
- List of Mississippian sites
- List of archaeological sites on the National Register of Historic Places in Indiana
- List of National Historic Landmarks in Indiana
- National Register of Historic Places listings in Vanderburgh County, Indiana
- National Register of Historic Places listings in Warrick County, Indiana
