= Palisade =

Defensive structure; typically a fence or wall made from wooden stakes

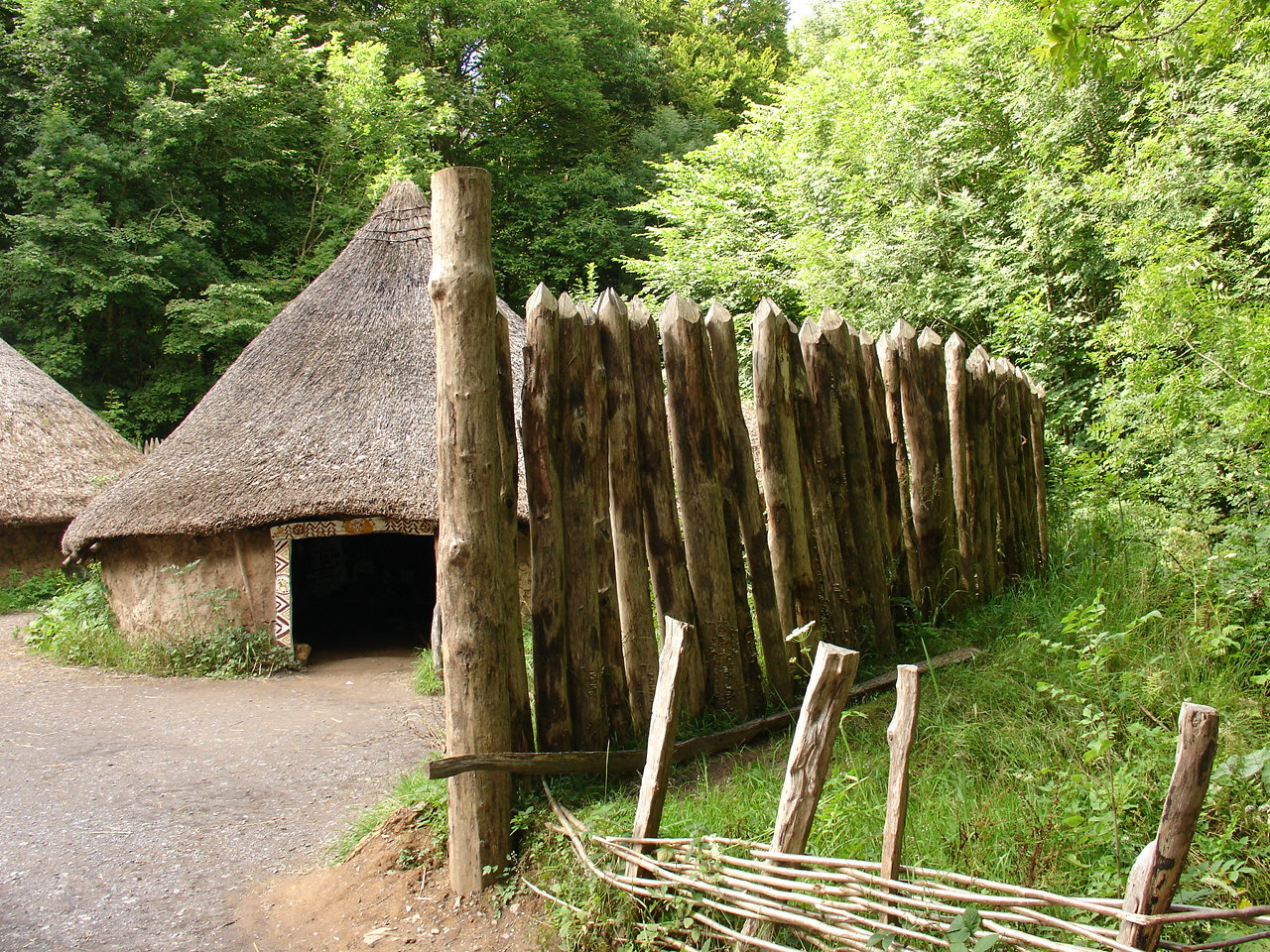
Reconstruction of a palisade in a Celtic village at St Fagans National History Museum, Wales

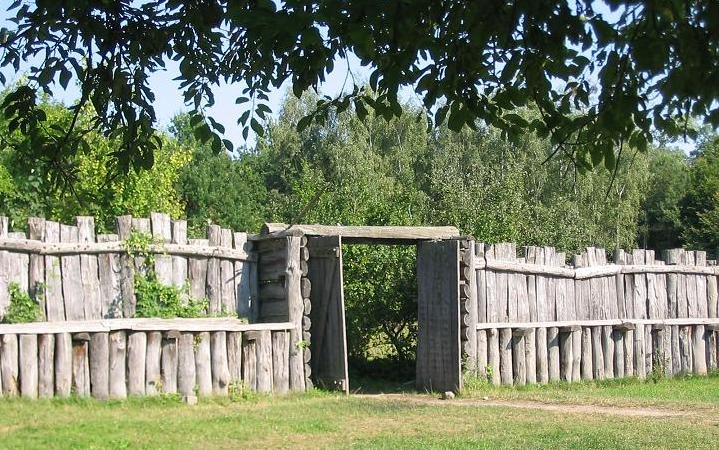
Reconstruction of a medieval palisade in Germany

A palisade, sometimes called a stakewall or a paling, is typically a row of closely placed, high vertical standing tree trunks or wooden or iron stakes used as a fence for enclosure or as a defensive wall. Palisades can form a stockade.

== Etymology ==
Palisade derives from pale, from the Latin word pālus, meaning stake, specifically when used side by side to create a wood defensive wall. In turn, pālus derives from the Old Italic word palūts, which may possibly derive from the Proto-Indo-European word pelh, meaning pale or gray.

(see 'pale', English: Etymology 2 on Wiktionary).

== Typical construction ==
Typical construction consisted of small or mid-sized tree trunks aligned vertically, with as little free space in between as possible. The trunks were sharpened or pointed at the top, and were driven into the ground and sometimes reinforced with additional construction. The height of a palisade ranged from around a metre to as high as 3–4 m. As a defensive structure, palisades were often used in conjunction with earthworks.

Palisades were an excellent option for small forts or other hastily constructed fortifications. Since they were made of wood, they could often be quickly and easily built from readily available materials. They proved to be effective protection for short-term conflicts and were an effective deterrent against small forces. However, because they were wooden constructions they were also vulnerable to fire and siege weapons.

Often, a palisade would be constructed around a castle as a temporary wall until a permanent stone wall could be erected.

== Ancient Greece and Rome ==
Both the ancient Greeks and Romans created palisades to protect their military camps. The Roman historian Livy describes the Greek method as being inferior to that of the Romans during the Second Macedonian War. The Greek stakes were too large to be easily carried and were spaced too far apart. This made it easy for enemies to uproot them and create a large enough gap in which to enter. In contrast, the Romans used smaller and easier to carry stakes which were placed closer together, making them more difficult to uproot.

== Precolumbian North America ==
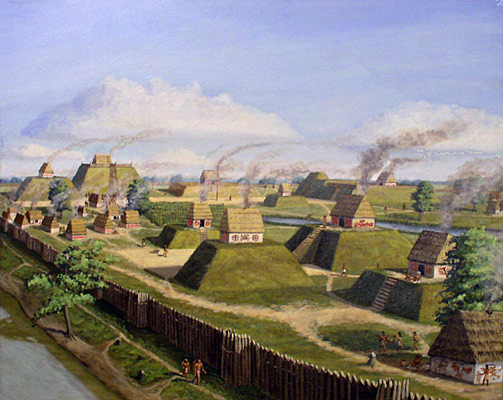
The Kincaid site, a Mississippian culture palisaded settlement in southern Illinois

The Iroquoian peoples, who coalesced as tribes around the Great Lakes, often defended their settlements with palisades. Within the palisades the peoples lived in communal groups in numerous longhouses, sometimes in communities as large as 2,000 people. Archeological evidence of such palisades has been found at numerous 15th and 16th-century sites in both Ontario, Canada, and in New York, United States.

Many settlements of the native Mississippian culture of the Midwestern United States used palisades. A prominent example is the Cahokia Mounds site in Collinsville, Illinois. A wooden stockade with a series of watchtowers or bastions at regular intervals formed a three-kilometre-long (2 mi) enclosure around Monk's Mound and the Grand Plaza. Archaeologists found evidence of the stockade during excavation of the area and indications that it was rebuilt several times, in slightly different locations. The stockade seems to have separated Cahokia's main ceremonial precinct from other parts of the city, as well as being a defensive structure.

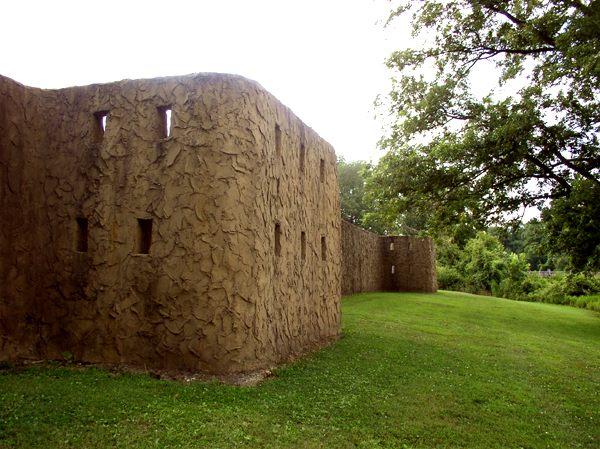
A section of reconstructed palisade at the Angel Mounds Site, a Mississippian site in Evansville, Indiana

Other examples include the Angel Mounds site in southern Indiana, Aztalan State Park in Wisconsin, the Kincaid site in Illinois, the Parkin site and the Nodena sites in northeastern Arkansas, and the Etowah site in Georgia.

== Colonial America ==
Palisaded settlements were common in Colonial North America, for protection against indigenous peoples and wild animals. The English settlements in Jamestown, Virginia (1607), Cupids, Newfoundland (1610) and Plymouth, Massachusetts (1620) were all originally fortifications that were surrounded by palisades.

Such defensive palisades were also frequently used in New France. In addition, colonial architecture used vertical palings as the walls of houses, in what was called poteaux en terre construction. Some 18th-century houses in this style survive in Ste. Genevieve, Missouri, initially settled by French colonists from the Illinois Country to the east of the Mississippi River.

== Ottoman Empire ==
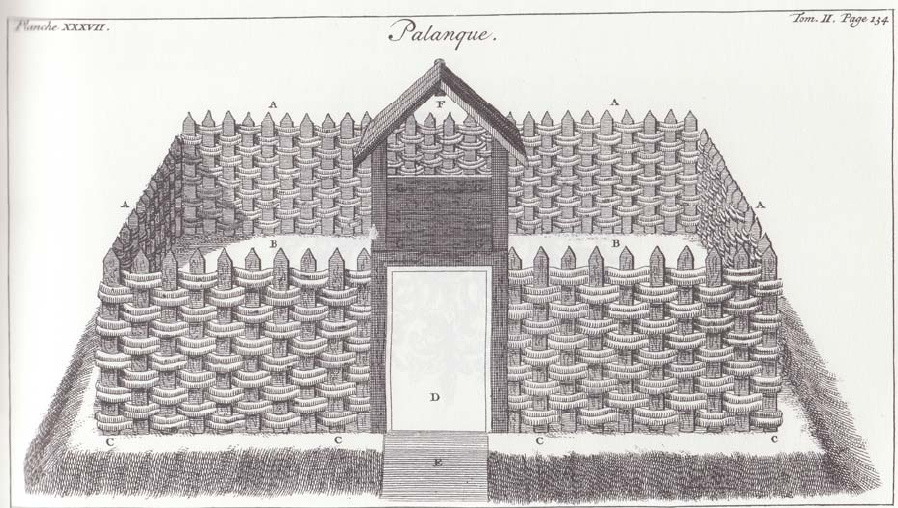
A simple palanka with its curtain walls made of timber and wattle fences

A "palanka" was a type of wooden fort constructed of palisades, built by the Ottoman Empire in the Balkans during the 16th and 17th centuries. They could be erected for a variety of reasons such as protecting a strategically valuable area or a town Some palankas evolved into larger settlements.

== Carolingian Empire ==
The Carolingian Empire adapted similar Greek/Roman styles of military fortification including the building of palisades as one measure of a layered defensive and offensive technique. These assumptions have largely relied on textual reference and architectural similarities. Archaeological parallels have provided further evidence of their use in the Medieval era. The Siege of Pavia, to conquer the Kingdom of the Lombards, is an example of effective Frankish adoption of wooden palisades to surround a city as a barrier to isolate and force surrender. Although wooden fortifications often decay, one of the best-preserved Carolingian hill forts that demonstrates use of palisade construction is in Büraburg, Germany, revealing earth ramparts topped with wooden palisades.

== New Zealand ==
The Māori people of New Zealand used wooden palisades paired with ditches to create strong defensive land boundaries for fortified villages known as pā. Many pā featured multiple rows of palisades, sometimes reinforced with tightly bound wooden posts and positioned at different heights to slow attackers and expose them to counter-attacks from defenders above. This was particularly effective with the introduction of muskets to Māori warfare tactics. At the siege of Kaiapoi Pā in the early 1830s during the Musket Wars, Ngāi Tahu historical accounts describe how warriors from Ngāti Toa were unable to breach the pā by force alone due to its thick timber double palisades. They eventually set fire to the outer palisades, weakening the structure and allowing entry.

== Half-timber palisade construction ==
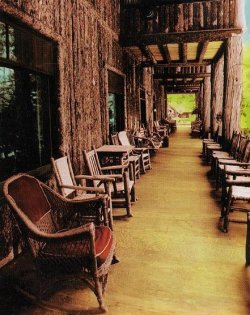
Vertical, half-timber palisade architecture at Covewood Lodge in Big Moose Lake in New York's Adirondack Mountains

In the late nineteenth century, when milled lumber was not available or practical, many Adirondack buildings were built using a palisade architecture. The walls were made of vertical half timbers; the outside, rounded half with its bark still on faced Adirondack weather, while the inside half was sanded and varnished for a finished wood look. Typically, the cracks between the vertical logs were filled with moss and sometimes covered with small sticks. Inside, the cracks were covered with narrow wooden battens. This palisade style was much more efficient to build than the traditional horizontal log cabin, since two half logs provided more surface area than one whole log and the vertical alignment meant a stronger structure for supporting loads like upper stories and roofs. It also presented a more finished look inside. Examples of this architectural style can still be found in the Adirondacks, such as around Big Moose Lake.

== Modern uses ==
In areas with extremely high rates of violent crime and property theft, a common means to prevent crime is for residential houses to be protected by perimeter defenses such as ornamental iron bars, brick walls, steel palisade fences, wooden palisade fences and electrified palisade fences (railings). The City of Johannesburg promotes the use of palisade fencing over opaque, usually brick, walls, as criminals cannot hide as easily behind the fence. Its manual on safety includes guidance, such as avoiding having vegetation alongside the fence, as this allows criminals to make an unseen breach.

== See also ==
- Palisado crown

== Bibliography ==
- Nicolle, David (2010). Ottoman Fortifications 1300-1710. Osprey Publishing.
- Murphey, Rhoads (1999). Ottoman Warfare 1500-1700.
