= Wickliffe Mounds =

Archaeological site in Kentucky, US

Wickliffe Site
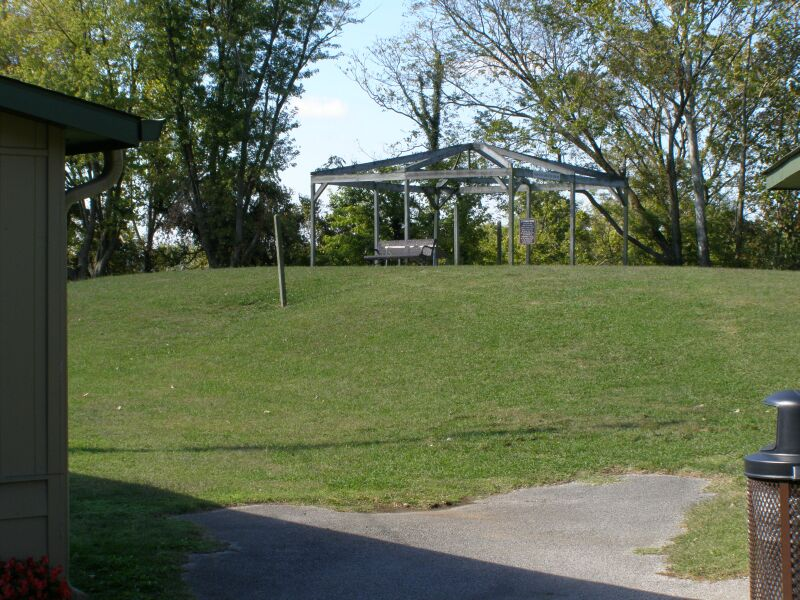
- Mound at the site

- Location in Kentucky today Wickliffe Mounds (the United States)
- 36°58′15.67″N 89°5′34.30″W
- Cultures: Mississippian culture
- Location: Ballard County, Kentucky, United States

History
- Built: 1000 CE
- Abandoned: 1350

Site notes
- Architectural styles: platform mounds, plazas Number of temples:
- Wickliffe Site
- U.S. National Register of Historic Places
- NRHP reference No.: 84000789
- Added to NRHP: December 08, 1984
- Responsible body: State

Wickliffe Mounds (15 BA 4) is a prehistoric, Mississippian culture archaeological site located in Ballard County, Kentucky, just outside the town of Wickliffe, about 3 miles (4.8 km) from the confluence of the Ohio and Mississippi rivers. Archaeological investigations have linked the site with others along the Ohio River in Illinois and Kentucky as part of the Angel phase of Mississippian culture. Wickliffe Mounds is controlled by the State Parks Service, which operates a museum at the site for interpretation of the ancient community. Listed on the National Register of Historic Places, it is also a Kentucky Archeological Landmark and State Historic Site.

== Prehistoric community at Wickliffe Mounds ==
The town at Wickliffe Mounds is located on a bluff above the Ohio River, and was both a ceremonial and administrative center of an important chiefdom in the Mississippian culture. At its peak it had a population probably reaching into the hundreds.

The site is dominated by two large platform mounds, with at least eight smaller mounds scattered around a central plaza area. Agriculture was based on the cultivation of maize as a staple, which was stored and supported denser populations and stratification of society. The Mississippian culture peoples had trade with societies as far away as North Carolina, Wisconsin, and the Gulf of Mexico. As in most other Mississippian chiefdoms, the community of Wickliffe had a social hierarchy ruled by a hereditary chief.

=== Chronology ===
Phases	Dates	Markers
Early Wickliffe	1100 - 1200 CE	High percentages of "Old Town Red", and some "Ramey Incised"
Middle Wickliffe	1200 - 1250 CE	Decrease in "Old Town Red", some "O'Byam Incised var. Adams"
Late Wickliffe	1250 - 1350 CE	Increase in "Old Town Red", presence of "O'Byam Incised var. Incised", "Nashville Negative Painted vars. Angel and Nashville", exotics such as "Winterville", "Leland Incised" and "Owens Punctated"

The site was inhabited between 1000 CE and 1350 CE. When Wickliffe began to be abandoned around 1300, the population had been slowly relocating to the Twin Mounds Site, several miles to the northeast near the confluence of the Mississippi and Ohio Rivers.

== Exploitation and excavation ==
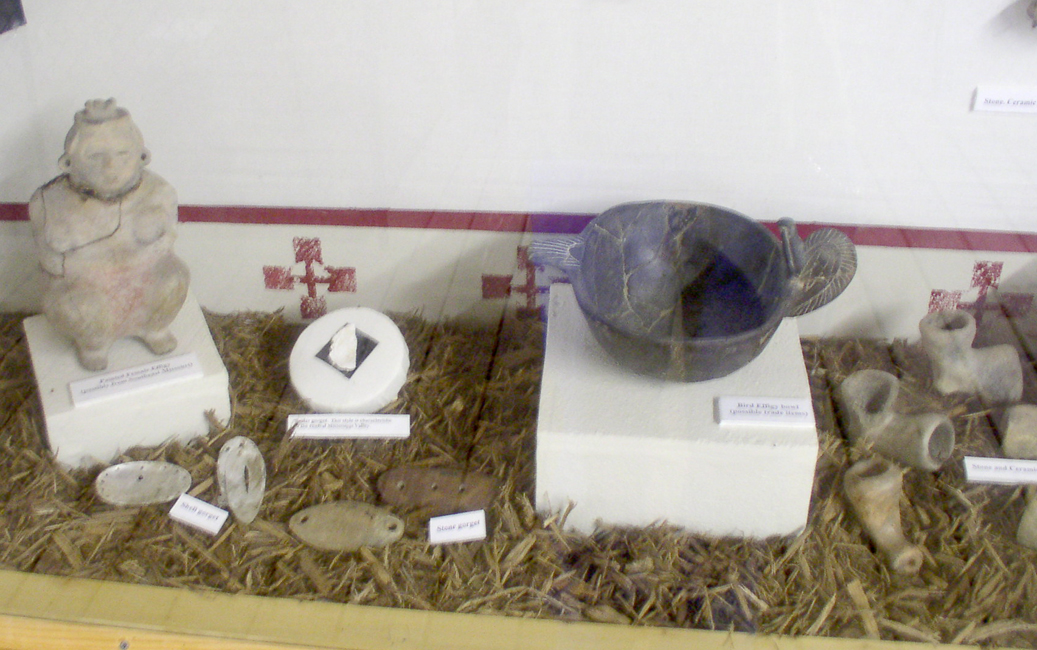
Mississippian culture pottery from the Wickliffe Mounds site in western Kentucky, including a human effigy pot.

Amateur and semi-professional excavations first began in the site around 1913 and continued sporadically for several decades. In 1932, Fain W. King, a lumberman, amateur archaeologist, and Indian artifact collector from Paducah, Kentucky, who was a member of the Board of Regents of the Alabama Museum of Natural History, Tuscaloosa requested and privately paid for the Alabama Museum archaeology staff to conduct the excavations of the center portions of three mounds (A, B, and C) at the Wickliffe site including the cemetery, Mound C. The excavations were done under the direction of Walter B, Jones, Alabama State Geologist, and David L. DeJarnette who was the crew chief. The first publicity flyer about the excavations was co-authored by TMN Lewis and Fain King and the first two separate journal articles about the excavations (Wisconsin Archaeologist and Tenn. Academy of Science) by each author said the work was undertaken as both a scientific and educational enterprise through which the public was enabled to examine a page of unwritten history. To defray the cost of operating the site a one dollar admission was charged for the one hour guided tour during the King era.

In cooperation with his wife, Blanche Busey King, he opened the site for tourists under the name "Ancient Buried City". The Kings' venture was highly controversial because they used sensational and misleading advertising, altered the site to make it more visually appealing, and made dubious and exaggerated interpretations of the site. These actions put them directly in opposition to professional archaeologists who studied the site and did not want it disturbed.

The Kings deeded the site to the Western Baptist Hospital in Paducah in 1946, that agreed to pay them a monthly stipend until both of their deaths. The hospital continued to operate the site as a tourism business until 1983 the year Mrs. King died. That year the hospital donated the site to Murray State University, to be used for research and training students. In 1984 the site's historic importance was recognized and it was added to the National Register of Historic Places. In 2004, the site became the 11th State Historical Site of Kentucky and entered the control of the Kentucky State Parks.

In addition to the freestanding Mound A, the major ceremonial mound, the museum park encloses three excavated mounds with archaeological features, to aid in their interpretation for visitors. It displays the outstanding collection of pottery and artifacts excavated on site. A mural with a birds-eye view of the Mississippian village on the bluff shows how the entire complex would have looked.

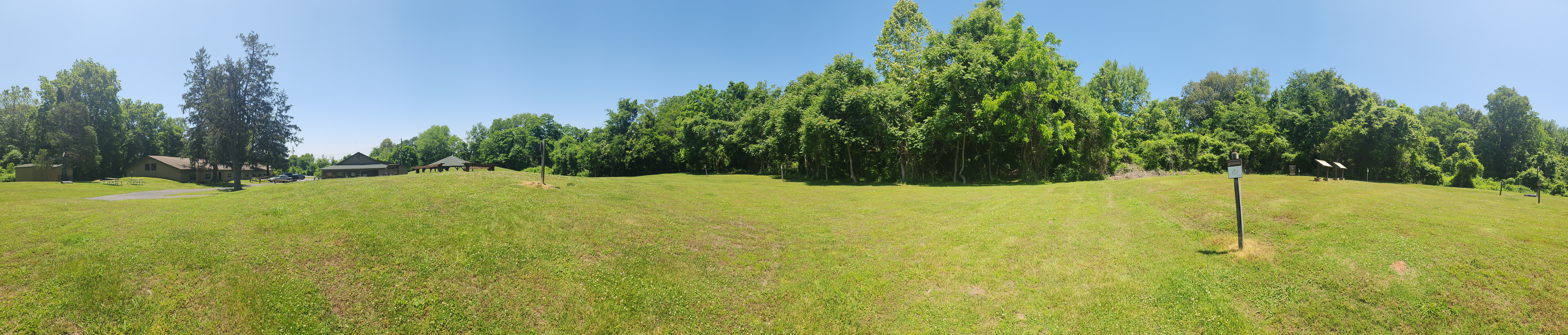
Panorama of Wickliffe Mounds

== Mound A ==
Ceremonial Mound is the largest of the mounds and was the location of ceremonial structures. This would have been political and religious center of the community. Originally excavated in 1932 and later in 1984–85, it has been determined that there are six phases of development.

== Mound B ==
The Architecture Building covered a mound that was residential. The Architecture Building has been removed and the excavation filled. This mound was built up over 200 years. Until 2016, visitors could look into the layers of this mound. It showed the evidence which archeologists used to identify this as a residential area, such as the layers of charred materials from cooking fires and the postholes for the poles that held the wattle and daub siding.

== Mound C ==
The Cemetery Building formerly covered the area used as the community's burial ground. Native American practices prohibit the display of the dead. The original remains were reinterred and artificial skeletons were placed to show the original burials. The exterior of the excavation has curtains with traditional designs to cover those remains that could not be removed. The burials are from the 13th century. They included many infants, as well as people with identifiable medical problems, including arthritis, tuberculosis (TB) and various injuries. All excavations have been filled and the interior can no longer be viewed.

== Mound D ==
The Lifeways Building is the excavation of an early village/residential portion of the community. The early homes were replaced by an elongated mound. The excavation shows the arrangement of earlier structures, including numerous infant burials.

== Kincaid focus ==
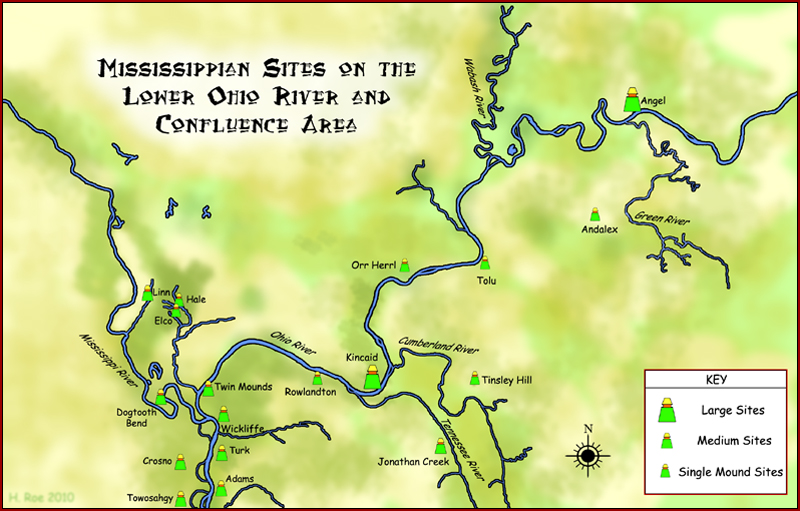
Mississippian sites on the Lower Ohio River

In the lower Ohio River valley in Illinois, Kentucky, and Indiana, the Mississippian-culture towns of Kincaid, Wickliffe, Tolu, and Angel Mounds have been more closely grouped together into a "Kincaid focus" archeological set, due to similarities in pottery assemblages and site plans. Most striking are the comparisons between the Kincaid and Angel sites, which include analogous site plans, stylistic similarities in artifacts, and geographic proximity. These connections have led some experts to hypothesize that the builders and residents were of the same society. Rare painted and incised sherds of Mississippian culture pottery have been found at all four sites, ranging from less than one percent near Kincaid to about three or four percent of the assemblage at Wickliffe. Some common pottery styles found in these sites include: Angel Negative Painted, Kincaid Negative Painted, and Matthews Incised. This pottery is shell-tempered and ranges from the smoothed surface and coarser temper of Mississippi Ware to the more polished surface and finer temper of Bell Ware.

== See also ==
- List of Mississippian sites
- Mississippian culture
- List of burial mounds in the United States
