= Fay-Cooper Cole =

Professor of anthropology (1881–1951)

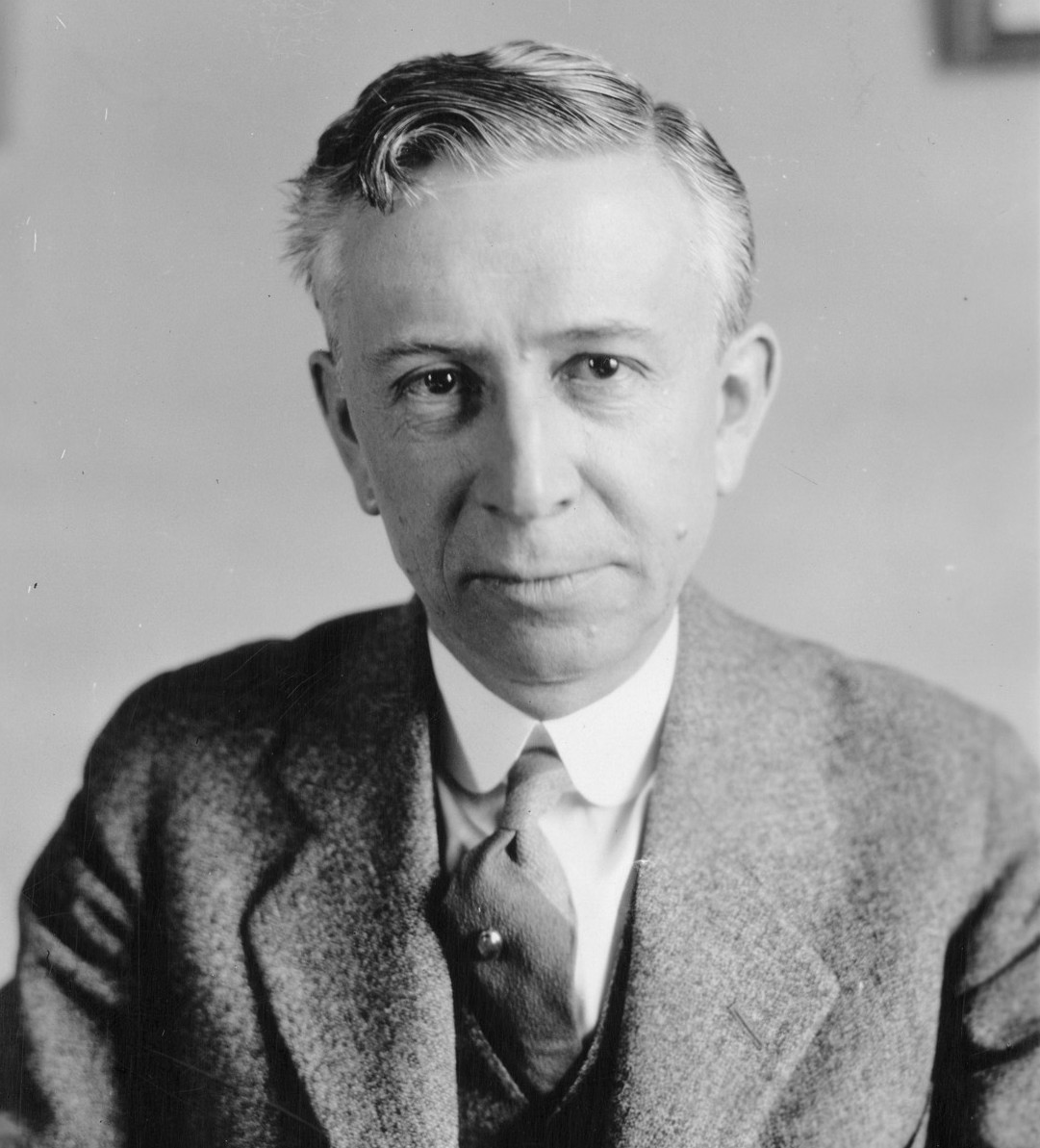
Fay-Cooper Cole (1881–1961).

Fay-Cooper Cole (8 August 1881 – 3 September 1961) was a professor of anthropology and founder of the anthropology department at the University of Chicago; he was a student of Franz Boas.He was a witness for the defense for John Scopes at the Scopes Trial. Cole also played a central role in planning the anthropology exhibits for the 1933 Century of Progress World's Fair. He was elected a Member of the American Philosophical Society in 1941. At the University of Chicago he helped amass a large collection of human remains and archeological objects, the Archaeology Laboratory Skeletal Collection.

== Early life ==
Cole was born in 1881 in Plainwell, Michigan to Ida J. Upright Cole and Dr. George LaMont Cole (1849–1918), a Los Angeles-area physician interested in southwestern archaeology. After graduating from Northwestern University in 1903, he did graduate work researching the Itneg people in the north of the then-American territory of the Philippine Islands at the University of Chicago, the University of Berlin in Germany, and Columbia University in New York, obtaining a doctorate in 1914.

== Career ==
Cole worked as the Assistant Curator of Anthropology at the Field Museum of Natural History after 1914. He led the museum’s Philippine expeditions, collecting more than 5,000 objects, traveling together with his wife, Mabel Cook Cole, with whom he co-authored The Story of Man.

=== University of Chicago ===
He was well-known for helping to establish the University of Chicago's graduate program in Anthropology (officially in 1929), as well as his broader archeological surveys in Illinois. Early iterations of the University of Chicago's Anthropology department began when William Rainey Harper appointed Frederick Starr as the first faculty member in anthropology in 1892. When Starr retired, the University brought in Cole to teach Anthropology courses, where he was later joined by faculty such as Edward Sapir, Wilton Krogman, Robert Redfield, and Sol Tax.

==== Archaeology – Laboratory Skeletal Collection ====
The Archaeology Laboratory Skeletal Collection was among his most lasting legacies at the University of Chicago. From the earliest iterations of the department in the late 1890s through the 1940s, a collection of remains of both Indigenous and non-Indigenous people, bone fragments, and artifacts were compiled, studied, stored, and possibly exhibited on campus. The skeletal collection contained human remains and archaeological objects taken and collected by faculty, students, curators, and donors through excavations of Illinois burial mounds such as the Fisher Mounds, Starved Rock, Kincaid, Algeria, Globe, Arizona, among materials from private donors. The collection also contained human remains from the University's Anatomy Department and Medical School. Donations accounted for a significant portion of the collection. Skeletal remains of 400 Indigenous people, as well as 10,000 bone fragments, stone, pottery and shell implements and artifacts largely excavated from Fisher and Adler Mounds, were donated in 1930 by George Langford, an engineer from Joliet who was also an amateur anthropologist, an honorary Research Associate in the Department of Anthropology at the University of Chicago, and later Curator of Plant Fossils at Field Museum.

When Cole retired, Robert Redfield and Sol Tax intermittently served as Chair of the Department of Anthropology. The politics of the department had changed with the faculty body, and Redfield and Tax determined that the Skeletal Collection no longer served the research purposes of the department, and the storage space could be better used. They tasked a graduate student in the department to inventory and report on the collection. Around 1950, much of the skeletal collection was unofficially dispersed to other institutions like Indiana University, Illinois State Museum, Beloit College, and the Field Museum. Under NAGPRA guidelines, these institutions are now responsible for deaccessioning and repatriating Native American human remains and funerary objects. The remaining skeletal materials do not account for the extent of the historical collection; the department's report recommended that the majority be “dumped.”

The University of Chicago Archaeology Laboratory continues to hold non-Native American human remains, while the paleoanthropology laboratory contains a large osteology collection.

== Personal life ==
Cole's son, LaMont C. Cole, served as Professor of Zoology in the Section of Ecology and Systematics at Cornell University.

== Works ==
- 1912: Chinese pottery in the Philippines, Volume 12
- 1913: The Wild Tribes of Davao District, Mindanao. Chicago: R.F.Cummings Philippine Expedition., Anthropological Series. Publication No. 170, Vol. XII, no. 2
- 1933: The Long Road from Savagery to Civilization. New York and London: Century Co.
- 1945: The Peoples of Malaysia. New York: Van Nostrand.
- 1956: The Bukidnon of the Philippines. Chicago: Chicago Natural History Museum.
