= Negative painting =

Painting technique

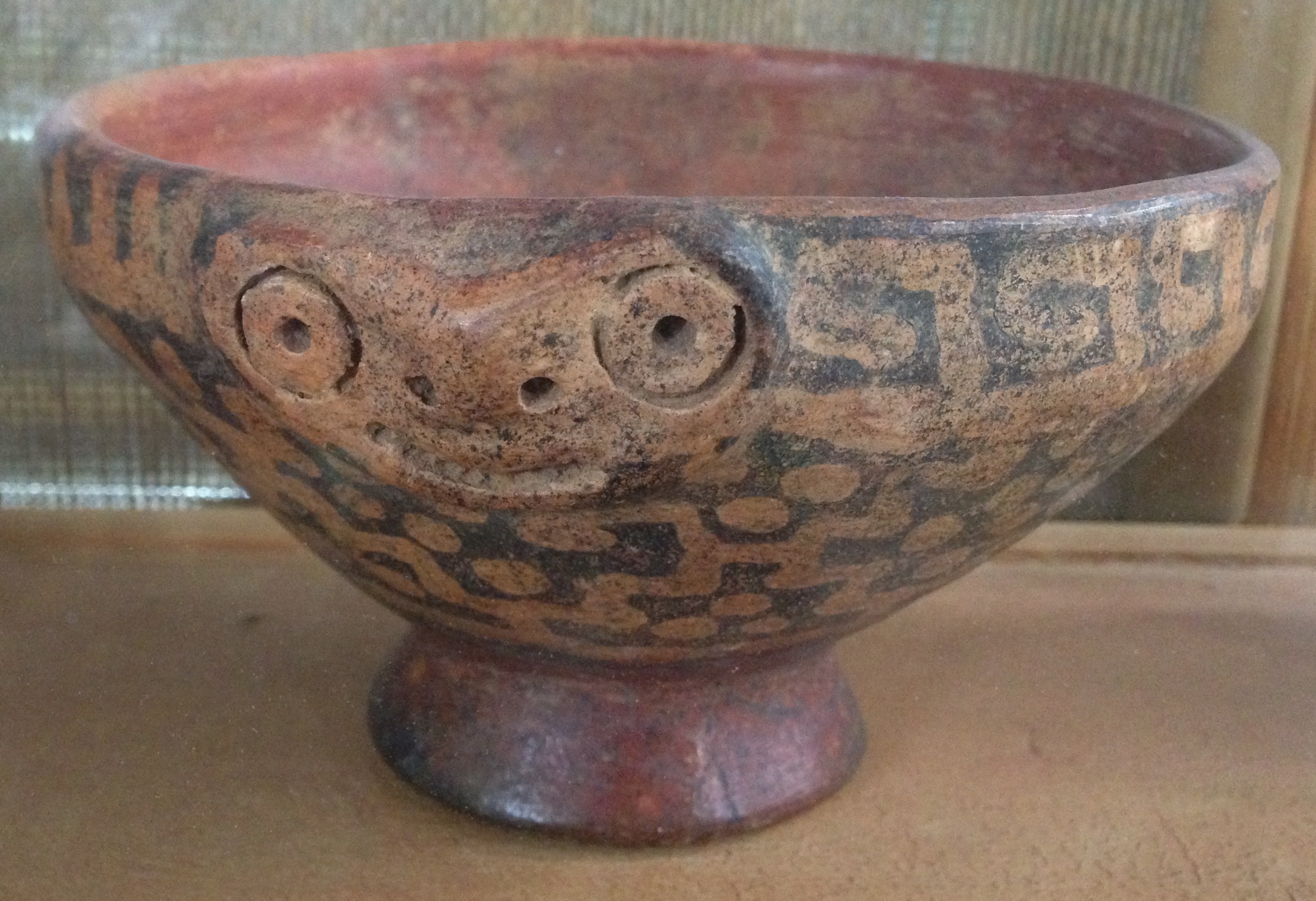
Negative painting on a pot from Ecuador

Negative painting (or lost color) is a painting technique where the background is painted dark, allowing the lighter color to appear as the design. There have been at least four methods proposed as to how negative painting was done. It is widely found on painted pottery, but it is speculated that “the first objects with negative painting may not have been pottery, but rather textiles or gourds.”

The term "negative painting" is also used by artistic painters, particularly with watercolor paints.

== History ==
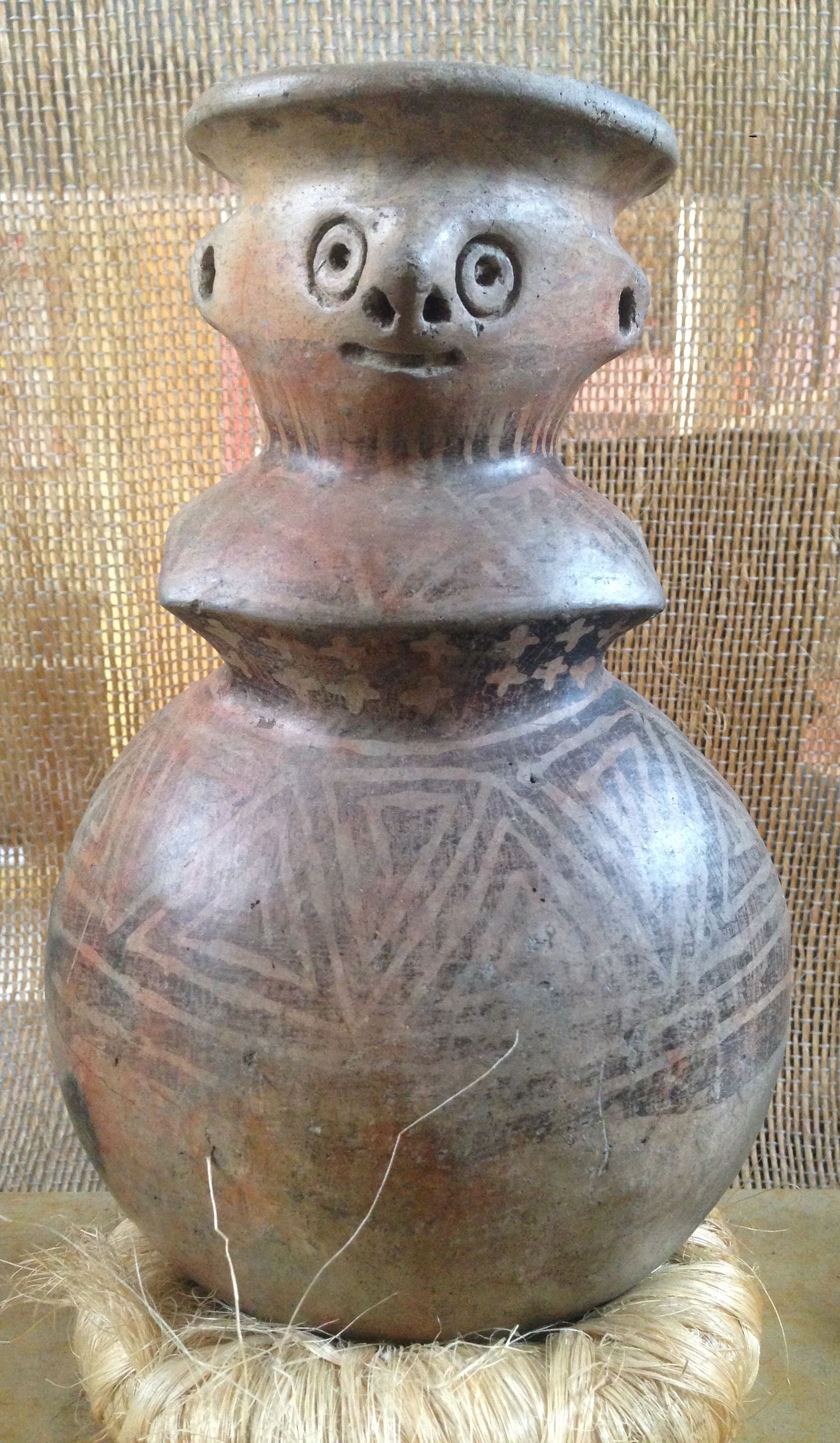
Negative painting on anthropomorphic figure from Ecuador

Historically, it was created and used most widely in the New World. "Arguments for the theory that negative painting was developed only once and spread from its point of origin are more numerous and more convincing." Robert Stigler believed that in the New World, it was first done on the south coast of Peru. Then, he believed, it spread northward, with examples found in Ecuador, Meso-America, and the USA. In the USA, it is most commonly found in the southeast, from Florida to Ohio to Illinois to Texas”, but it is not believed that it originated there. One example of negative painting on pottery has been found in Wisconsin, but it is assumed to have travelled there by trade, not to have been locally produced.

Others are not so sure about this scenario: “When and how the negative painting technique became part of craft traditions in North America is still unclear. The method may have been introduced via diffusion through Mexico or could have easily been an independent invention.” Curry lists a variety of scenarios that have been proposed for the creation and diffusion of negative painting on pottery, including the proposal that it was carried across the Caribbean to the mouth of the Mississippi and was diffused from there. “Negative painted pottery (NPP) is one of the most distinctive kinds of pottery made by Mississippian culture during the Middle Mississippian period (ca. A.D. 1200-1500) in eastern North America.”

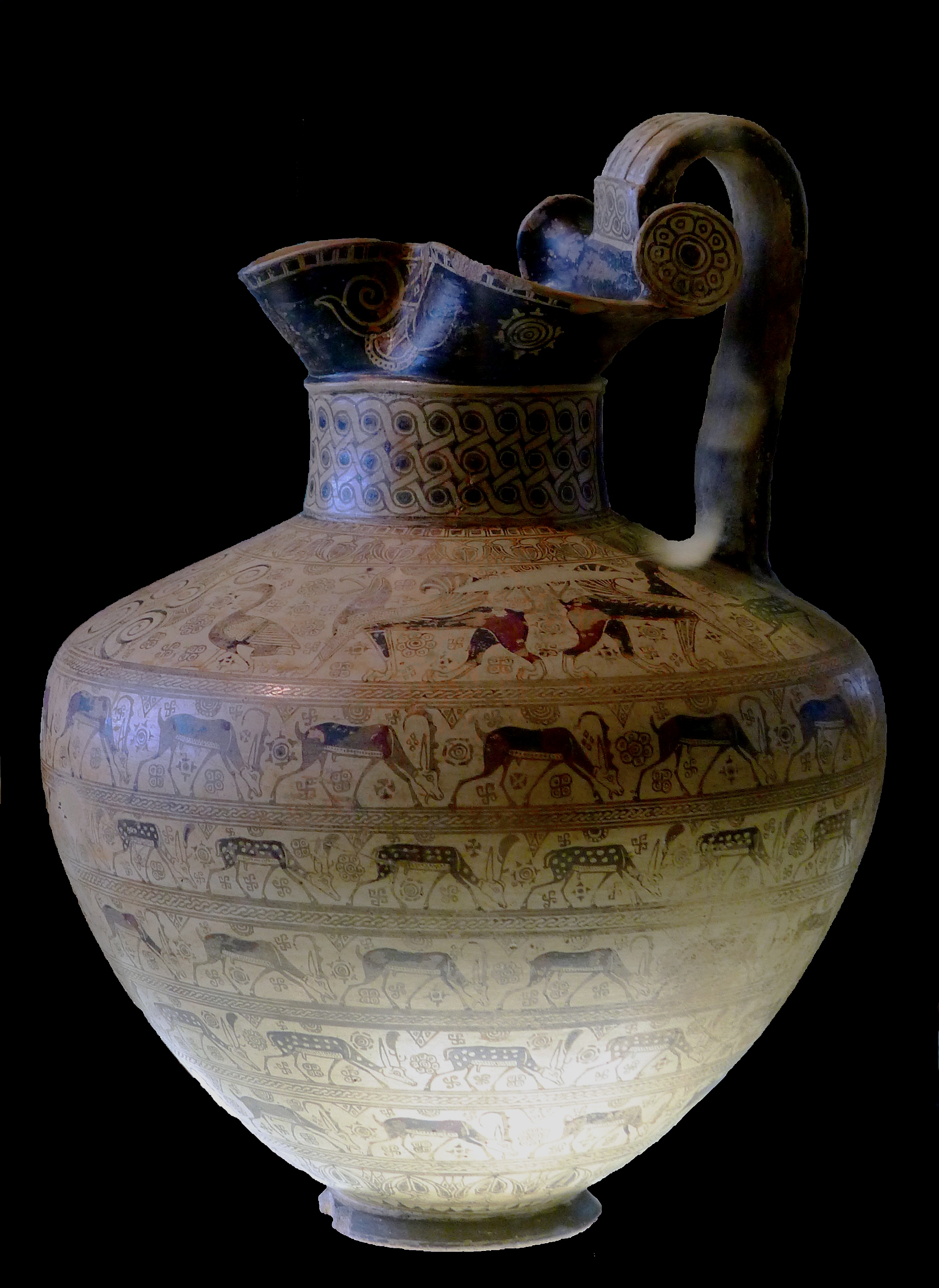
Negative painting on a pitcher from Miletus, Greece, 7th century BC

There have also been examples of negative painting on pottery in Colombia and on the north coast of Brazil near the mouth of the Amazon. There are also examples of negative painted pottery from the ancient Mediterranean, from Italy and Miletus and Rhodes.

== Relevant literature ==
- Cheetham, Linda. "Pre-Columbian negative painted pottery; Some notes and observations." Bulletin of the Experimental Firing Group 3 (1985): 34-41.
- Gerek, Mary-Louis. "Painted Prehistoric Iroquois Pottery Found in the Bristol Hills of New York." Practical Aids to Archaeological Investigations: Small Find Illustration Eugene L. Sterud and Ann-Kristin Bohlin 1 A Preliminary Report on the Prehistoric Archeological Resources of the Onesquethaw Creek Historic District: 28.
- Giannossa, Lorena Carla, Marianna Acquaviva, Caterina Laganara, Rocco Laviano, and Annarosa Mangone. "Applications of a synergic analytical strategy to figure out technologies in medieval glazed pottery with “negative decoration” from Italy." Applied Physics A 116, no. 4 (2014): 1541-1552.
- Haberland, Wolfgang. "Black‐on‐red painted ware and associated features in intermediate area." Ethnos 22, no. 3-4 (1957): 148-161.
- Hilgeman, Sherri L. "Lower Ohio Valley Negative Painted Ceramics." Midcontinental Journal of Archaeology (1985): 195-213.
- Mera, Harry Percival. "Negative Painting on Southwest Pottery." Southwestern Journal of Anthropology 1, no. 1 (1945): 161-166.
- Willey, Gordon R. "Horizon styles and pottery traditions in Peruvian archaeology." American Antiquity 11, no. 1 (1945): 49-56.
- Willey, Gordon R. "The cultural context of the Crystal River Negative-Painted style." American Antiquity 13, no. 4Part1 (1948): 325-328.
- Willey, Gordon R., and Philip Phillips. "Negative-Painted Pottery from Crystal River, Florida." American Antiquity 10, no. 2 (1944): 173-185.
