= Kincaid Mounds State Historic Site =

Archaeological site in Illinois, US

Kincaid Mounds 11 MX2 11; 11 PO2 10
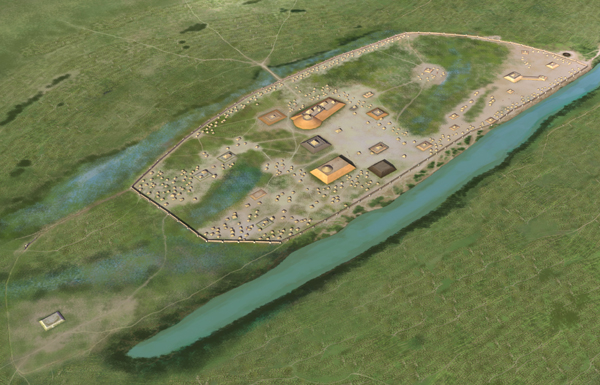
- A digital reconstruction of the late occupation phase of the site circa 1300 CE

- Location within Illinois today
- 37°4′50″N 88°29′30″W
- Cultures: Middle Mississippian culture
- Location: Brookport, Illinois,
- Region: Southern Illinois

Site notes
- Architectural style: platform mounds
- Archaeologists: Fay-Cooper Cole, Richard MacNeish
- Kincaid Site
- U.S. National Register of Historic Places
- U.S. National Historic Landmark
- Illinois State Historic Site
- NRHP reference No.: 66000326

Significant dates
- Added to NRHP: October 15, 1966
- Designated NHL: July 19, 1964

The Kincaid Mounds Historic Site (11MX2-11; 11PO2-10) c. 1050–1400 CE, is a Mississippian culture archaeological site located at the southern tip of present-day U.S. state of Illinois, along the Ohio River. Kincaid Mounds has been notable for both its significant role in native North American prehistory and for the central role the site has played in the development of modern archaeological techniques. The site had at least 11 substructure platform mounds (it ranks fifth among known sites of this period for the number of such structures), and 8 other monuments.

Artifacts from the settlement link its major habitation and the construction of the mounds to the Mississippian culture period. It is 140 miles from Cahokia, the major center of Mississippian culture in North America. The Kincaid site was also occupied earlier by indigenous peoples of the Late Woodland period. The site was declared a National Historic Landmark in 1964 for its significance as a major Native American mound center and prehistoric trading center along the Ohio River.

== Site context ==
Built in the floodplain adjacent to the Ohio River, the site straddles modern-day Massac and Pope counties in deep southern Illinois. This area is colloquially known as Little Egypt. The Illinois Historic Preservation Agency owns and operates an area including several mounds in Massac County related to the Kincaid site. This includes the majority of the estimated 141-acre (0.57 km^{2}) area contained within a wooden palisade, as well as an undefined area of additional occupation to the west. The Pope County portion of the site is privately owned.

== Excavation ==
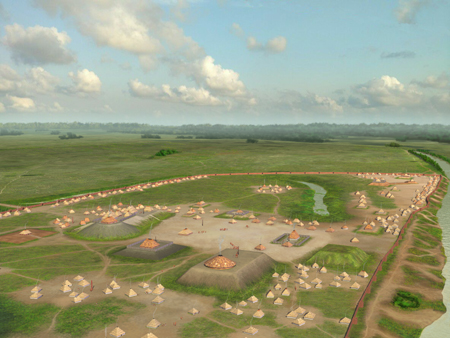
Artist's conception of Kincaid as it may have looked during its peak

The Kincaid site was the subject of major excavations by the University of Chicago from 1934–1941, during which several anthropologists and archaeologists who later had notable careers were trained under the direction of Fay-Cooper Cole; they included Richard MacNeish, discoverer of the origins of maize.

When the University of Chicago excavated Kincaid in the 1930s and 1940s, their team identified nine mounds on the site's Massac County portion. The Chicago team excavated a major burial mound, Pope Mound 2, yielding further evidence for hierarchical social structures and Kincaid's status as a chiefdom. The mound contained a number of stone box graves and log-lined tombs, similar to those frequently found to the south in the Middle Cumberland Valley of Tennessee. However, the Chicago archaeologists were puzzled to find little evidence of social hierarchy or a primary personage in the burials.

Since 2003, investigations of the site with new technology and excavations by teams from Southern Illinois University have yielded significant new data, including identification of another mound. In 2003, a tenth mound was identified. It is a small mound that was later covered with a midden, and it lies along the current road near the county line on the southeastern corner of the town plaza. Chicago archaeologists had excavated around this mound, but they chose to exclude it from their list of possible mounds due to a lack of clarity about its identity. Identification of this portion of the site as an artificial earthwork came after Southern Illinois University returned to the site in 2003 to re-excavate the hills that were thought to be possible mounds.

Excavations prior to construction of an informational kiosk and viewing platform in 2003 revealed six Baumer-phase pit features dating to 250 BCE to 1 CE. One of the pits contained the intentionally buried remains of a small domestic dog, a rare find for the area. Since 2003, teams from Southern Illinois University have been conducting more intensive research at the site.

== History ==
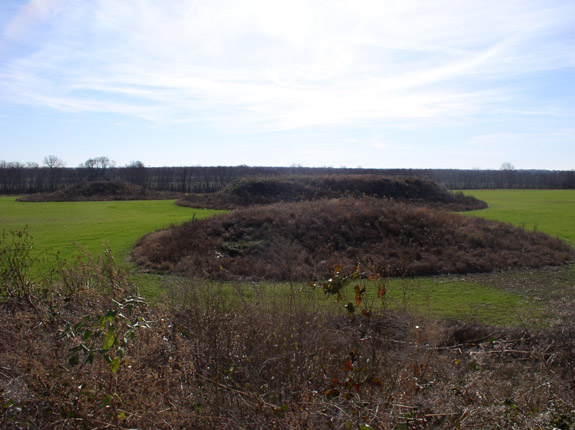
A photo of the Kincaid Site showing (clockwise from left) mounds 7, 8, and 9

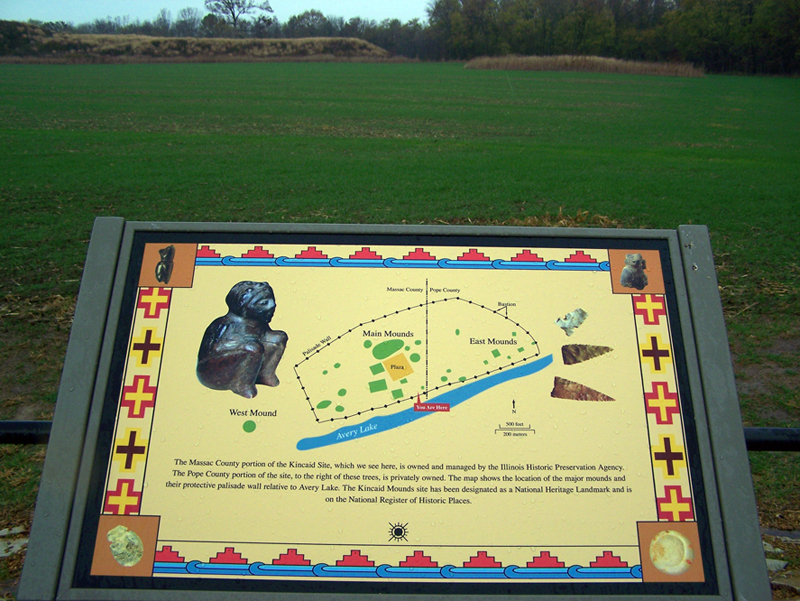
Diagram of site on one of three information plaques on display

Kincaid area has been inhabited for thousands of years, into the Archaic Period (8000 to 2000 BCE). The Chicago crew named this period the Faulkner Component, a pre-pottery culture. Except for the lack of pottery, archeologically the evidence showed that it was otherwise very similar to the subsequent cultures of the Early Woodland, such as the Adena culture (1000 to 200 BCE).

Teams documented more intensive occupation in the ensuing Early Woodland and Middle Woodland periods. It was similar to the contemporaneous Adena and Hopewell cultures that began during this time period throughout eastern North America. This involved a more sedentary lifestyle and a semi-agricultural culture characterized by the use of limestone-tempered ceramics and the presence of semi-permanent housing. The extensive occupation is known as the Baumer culture (a local variation of the Crab Orchard culture). The Baumer-phase occupants of Kincaid used no Havana Hopewell culture motifs when decorating their pottery, as did other Crab Orchard peoples, but used cord and fabric marking. They also preferred more limestone and grog tempering in their clay paste.

Occupation continued into the Late Woodland period. This period is known as the Lewis culture. During the Mississippi period, Kincaid developed from the local Lewis community about 1050 CE. Kincaid was a near neighbor of Cahokia, only 140 miles (230 km) away, and is thought to have been influenced by its development as the major site in North America of Mississippian culture. The people at Kincaid built at least 19 earthwork mounds during this period, mostly the characteristic Mississippian platform mounds. A large central plaza, constructed by filling and leveling, was created at the center of the community; it is surrounded by the major mounds, one of which is almost 500 feet (150 m) long. Although none of Kincaid's earthworks rivals the size of Monks Mound at Cahokia, the largest is 9m tall and ranks 12th in size among all known Mississippian mounds. The overall site ranks 5th in size among the Mississippian sites, in terms of the number of mounds constructed at the site. The remaining platform mounds' heights range from 8 feet (2.4 m) to 30 feet (9.1 m).

Remains of large buildings atop the main mounds seemed to indicate temples or council houses. Carved figurines in coal and fluorite seemed to characterize the local iconography, with images showing connections to the Southeastern Ceremonial Complex (SECC). Trade for chert resources appeared to extend into Missouri, Tennessee, and other parts of Illinois. Several examples of Mill Creek chert, which came from quarries very near by, were found at the site. Mississippian culture pottery painted with a negative resist are also characteristic of the site.

While Early occupation at Kincaid was apparently sparse, the site became a major power during the Middle period and Late period. Most of the major mound construction as well as the construction of multiple sequential wooden palisades occurs in the Middle and Late periods, post-dating 1200 CE. As Cahokia Mounds declined in the 1300 CE range, Kincaid increased in scale and power until it was the dominant power in the Middle Mississippian region, remaining that way for 50-100 years before experiencing a sharp decline itself.

Mississippian culture occupation at the site appears to have ended by 1400–1450 CE. No documented occupation of the site by historic Native American tribes exists. It remained uninhabited until the arrival of American settlers more than 300 years after the site was abandoned.

== Kincaid focus ==
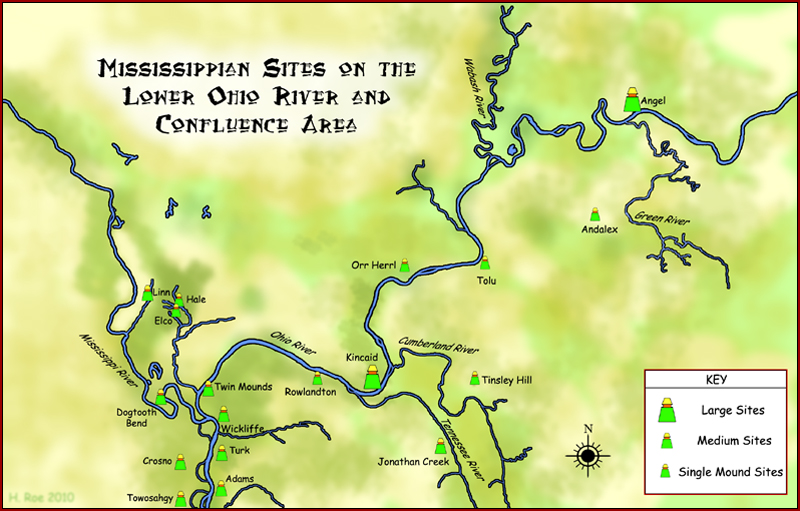
Mississippian sites on the Lower Ohio River

In the lower Ohio River valley in Illinois, Kentucky, and Indiana, the similar Mississippian-culture towns of Kincaid, Wickliffe, Tolu, and Angel Mounds were once grouped together into a "Kincaid focus" set, and a strong relationship was proposed among them. While still likely culturally-related, the upstream Angel Mounds is no longer thought to be a close parallel to Kincaid, as the sites had a different trajectory.

== See also ==
- Mississippi Valley: Culture, phase, and chronological periods table – List of archaeological periods
- List of archaeological sites on the National Register of Historic Places in Illinois
- List of Mississippian sites
