= History of Kentucky =

Kentucky's prehistory spans thousands of years, shaped by its diverse geography and location. Human occupation dates to approximately 9,500 BCE; a shift from hunter-gatherer to agriculture occurred around 1800 BCE. By 900 CE, a Mississippian culture emerged in western and central Kentucky, while a Fort Ancient culture developed in the east.

Europeans first visited Kentucky in the late 17th century traveling on the Ohio River and in the late 18th century through the Appalachian Mountains. Following the Treaty of Fort Stanwix (1768), early settlers clashed with regional Native Americans over hunting grounds, eventually leading to Lord Dunmore's War (1774) and the Cherokee–American wars. Kentucky evolved politically from Virginia's Kentucke County (1777–1780) into the District of Kentucky (1780–1792), and became the 15th state on June 1, 1792.

Kentucky's early economy relied on slave labor, family farms, and southern-style plantations growing tobacco and hemp for the national market. Slavery was central to the economy and in politics until abolished by the 13th Amendment in 1865. During the Civil War, Kentucky was a border state with split allegiances between Union and Confederate sympathizers. In 1861, a group of pro-Confederate Kentuckians created a shadow government at the Russellville Convention and chose Bowling Green as the capital. Though the Confederacy initially had a foothold in the region, Union forces held the state from 1862 onward. Because Kentucky never left the Union, the commonwealth experienced Reconstruction differently from other states that seceded.

Kentucky has a history of regional "feuds" rooted in political, economic, and social tensions. The violence continued with the assassination of Governor William Goebel in 1900. Industrialization rose in the late 19th and early 20th centuries, with coal mining and manufacturing industries playing a significant role in the state's economy.

In 1919, the 18th Amendment to the U.S. Constitution went into effect, prohibiting the sale and consumption of alcohol. Kentucky, a major producer of bourbon and other distilled spirits, saw significant social and economic changes as a result. Moonshining, which was long-established in the state, became a lucrative venture for individuals during this era.

In the mid-20th century, Kentucky faced major civil rights struggles as activists fought for equality for African Americans and other marginalized groups. Since then, environmental issues, especially the impact of coal mining on public health and the environment, have driven political and social change. The late 20th and early 21st centuries saw economic shifts due to globalization and increased immigration, leading to demographic changes and debates over immigration policy.

== Etymology and nickname ==
The etymology of "Kentucky" or "Kentucke" is uncertain. It may derive from an Iroquois name meaning "land of tomorrow." Other theories suggest it comes from the Iroquois word kentake ("meadow land"), the Wyandotte (or possibly Cherokee or Iroquois) word ken-tah-the ("land of tomorrow"), the Algonquian term kin-athiki ("river bottom"), a Shawnee word meaning "at the head of a river," or an Indian word meaning "land of cane and turkeys." Kentucky's nickname, the "Bluegrass State," comes from imported grass grown in the central part of the state, highlighting the Bluegrass region's role in the state's economy and history.

Some scholars argue that "Kentucky" derives from the Iroquoian word kentake, meaning "meadow" or "prairie." This aligns with the Mohawk term kenhtà:ke and the Seneca term gëdá'geh, both meaning "at the field." An alternative theory proposes an Algonquian origin from the term Kenta Aki, meaning "Land of Our Fathers" or "Land of Those Who Became Our Fathers." In many Algonquian languages, "aki" means "land."

Folk etymologies suggest the name may refer to the region's abundance of cane and wild turkeys, but these interpretations lack strong historical support.

== Pre-European habitation and culture ==
=== Paleo-Indian era (9500–7500 BCE) ===
Based on evidence in other regions, humans were probably living in Kentucky before 10,000 BCE; however, archaeological evidence of their occupation has not yet been documented. Stone tools, particularly projectile points (arrowheads) and scrapers, provide the earliest evidence of human activity in the Americas. Paleo-Indian bands likely relocated their camps several times a year. These camps were typically small, consisting of 20 to 50 people. Social organization was egalitarian, with no formal leaders or social hierarchies. Linguistic, blood-type, and molecular evidence, including DNA analysis, indicate that Indigenous Americans descend from East Siberian populations.

At the end of the last ice age, between 8000 and 7000 BCE, Kentucky's climate stabilized; this led to population growth, and technological advances resulted in a more sedentary lifestyle. The warming trend killed Pleistocene megafauna such as the mammoth, mastodon, giant beavers, tapirs, short-faced bear, giant ground sloths, saber-toothed tiger, horse, bison, muskox, stag-moose, and peccary. All were native to Kentucky during the ice age, and became extinct or moved north as the ice sheet retreated.

No skeletal remains of Paleo-Indians have been discovered in Kentucky. While numerous Paleo-Indian Clovis points have been found, there is little evidence at Big Bone Lick State Park to suggest that they hunted mastodons. Radiocarbon evidence shows that mastodons and Clovis people lived at the same time. However, aside from one fossil that might have a cut mark and some Clovis artifacts found mixed with the bones, there is no clear proof that humans hunted Mastodons at the site.

=== Archaic period (7500 – 1000 BCE) ===
The extinction of large game animals at the end of the Ice Age led to cultural shifts in the area by 7500 BCE. By 4000 BCE, the people of Kentucky had begun relying on native wetlands for food. Large shell middens — ancient trash piles – provide evidence of clam and mussel consumption.

Middens have been found along rivers, but there is little evidence of Archaic occupation on riverbanks before 3000 BCE. Archaic Kentucky natives lived in small social groups made up of a few cooperating families. Large shell middens, artifact caches, human and dog burials, and burnt-clay flooring suggest that some Archaic settlements were permanent. White-tailed deer, mussels, fish, oysters, turtles, and elk were significant food sources.

==== Archaic tools and weapons ====
The atlatl, a spear-throwing device, was developed by Native Americans to enhance hunting efficiency by allowing spears to be thrown with greater force and accuracy. Archaeological evidence suggests that the atlatl was introduced to the Americas over 15,000 years ago, enabling hunters to launch darts at speeds up to 90 miles per hour.

Atlatls have been discovered in Kentucky dating to the Archaic period. Notably, the Indian Knoll site along the Green River in Ohio County, Kentucky has yielded significant findings. Excavations led by William Snyder Webb in the late 1930s uncovered numerous artifacts, including atlatl components such as hooks and weights, associated with burials dating back approximately 5,300 years.

The Indian Knoll site dates back over 5,000 years. While evidence suggests earlier habitation, the area experienced its most significant period of settlement between approximately 3000 and 2000 BCE, when the climate and vegetation closely resembled modern conditions. The stable environment of the Green River floodplain supported agricultural development, while nearby mussel beds further encouraged permanent settlement. By the end of the Archaic period, Indigenous inhabitants had cultivated a form of squash, valued both for its edible seeds and its utility as a container.

Similarly, the Carlston Annis Shell Mound, also located along the Green River, has produced artifacts linked to atlatl use. Excavations in the late 1930s revealed atlatl weights among the grave goods, indicating the significance of the atlatl in the daily life and hunting practices of Archaic period inhabitants.

Other Archaic tools were grooved axes, conical and cylindrical pestles, bone awls, cannel coal beads, hammerstones, and bannerstones. "Hominy holes" – depressions in sandstone made by the grinding of hickory nuts or seed to make them easier to use for food – were also used.

People buried their dogs in shell (mussel) mound sites along the Green and Cumberland Rivers. At the Indian Knoll site, 67,000 artifacts have been uncovered; they include 4,000 projectile points and twenty-three dog burials, seventeen of which are well-preserved. Some dogs were buried alone; others were buried with their masters, with adults (male and female), or with children. Archaic dogs were medium-sized, standing approximately 14 to 18 inches (35 to 45 centimeters) tall at the shoulder; genetic studies indicate that all ancient and modern dogs share a common ancestry, descending from an ancient, now-extinct wolf population. Dogs held a significant place in the lives of Archaic and historic Indigenous peoples. The Cherokee, for instance, regarded dogs as spiritual beings, attributing to them moral and sacred qualities. Similarly, the Yuchi tribe, who resided near the Green River, may have shared these beliefs.

=== Woodland period (1000 BCE – 1600 CE) ===
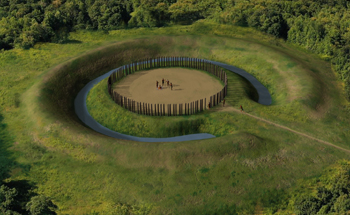
Mount Horeb Site 1, an Adena culture causewayed ring ditch and timber circle located in Fayette County

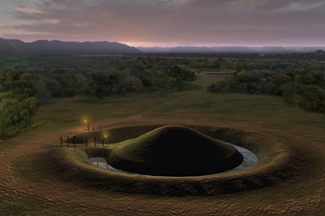
Biggs Site, also known as the Portsmouth Earthworks Group D, an Adena culture archaeological site located Greenup County

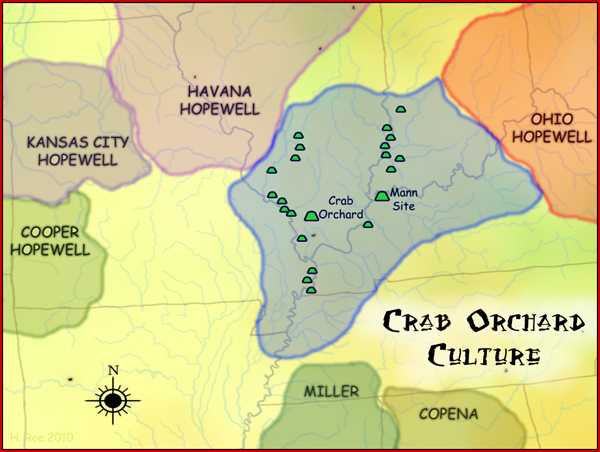
The Native American Crab Orchard culture existed in western Kentucky and southern Indiana from c. 200 BCE to 500 CE.

Native Americans began cultivating various species of wild plants around 1800 BCE, marking a shift from a hunter-gatherer society to one centered on agriculture. In Kentucky, this transition gave rise to the Woodland period, which followed the Archaic period (North America) and preceded the development of the agricultural Mississippian culture. The period saw significant advancements in shelter construction, the production of stone and bone tools, textile manufacturing, leather crafting, and crop cultivation. Archaeologists have identified the Crab Orchard culture as a distinct Middle Woodland tradition in the western part of the state.

The period was marked by advancements in shelter construction, stone and bone tool production, textile manufacturing, leather crafting, and crop cultivation. Archaeologists have identified a distinct Middle Woodland culture, the Crab Orchard culture, in the western part of the state. Remains of two significant groups—the Adena (Early Woodland) and the Hopewell (Middle Woodland)—have been discovered in present-day Louisville, as well as in the central Bluegrass region and northeastern Kentucky.

The Woodland period is marked by the introduction of pottery, its widespread use, and more advanced designs and decorations, starting around 1000 BCE. Archaic pots were thick, heavy, and fragile, while Woodland pottery was more carefully designed and used for cooking and storing extra food. Around 200 BCE, maize cultivation migrated to the eastern United States from Mexico. The introduction of corn changed Kentucky agriculture from growing indigenous plants to a maize-based economy. In addition to cultivating corn, the Woodland people also cultivated giant ragweeds, amaranth (pigweed), and maygrass. The initial four plants known to have been domesticated were goosefoot (Chenopodium berlandieri), sunflower (Helianthus annuus var. macroscarpus), marsh elder (Iva annua var. macrocarpa), and squash (Cucurbita pepo ssp. ovifera). Woodland people grew tobacco, which they smoked ritually; they still used stone tools, especially for grinding nuts and seeds. They mined Mammoth and Salts Caves for gypsum and mirabilite, a salty seasoning. Shellfish was still an important part of their diet, and the most common prey were white-tailed deer. They continued to make and use spears; late in the Woodland period, however, the straight bow became the weapon of choice in the eastern United States (evidenced by smaller arrowheads during this period).

Between 450 and 100 BCE, Native Americans started building earthen burial mounds. The Woodland Indians buried their dead in cone-shaped (later flat or oval) mounds, often 10 to 20 feet (3.0–6.1 m) high. In the 19th century, they were called "Mound Builders" by European observers.

The Eastern Agricultural Complex allowed Kentucky natives to shift from a nomadic lifestyle to living in permanent villages. They built larger houses and formed bigger communities, though intensive farming only started with the Mississippian culture.

==== Mississippian culture (900 – 1600 CE) ====
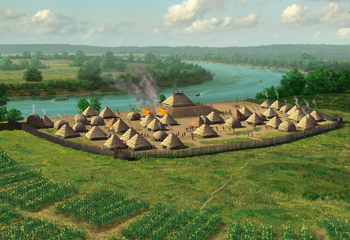
Artist's conception of Annis Mound and Village, a Mississippian site in Butler County, c. 1250–1300 CE

Maize became highly productive around 900 CE, replacing the Eastern Agricultural Complex with the maize-based farming of the Mississippian culture. Native village life focused on planting, growing, and harvesting maize and beans, which made up 60% of their diet.

Mississippian culture practiced agriculture that prominently featured cultivation of the "Three Sisters" crops of maize, beans, and squash. These crops were often planted together in a symbiotic arrangement where beans climbed the cornstalks, and the broad leaves of squash helped retain soil moisture and suppress weeds. This method of intercropping enhanced agricultural efficiency and soil health. Additionally, hunting played a significant role in their subsistence strategies, with white-tailed deer being a primary game animal.

Mississippian culture pottery was more varied and elaborate than that of the Woodland period (including painting and decoration), and included bottles, plates, pans, jars, pipes, funnels, bowls, and colanders. Potters added handles to jars, attaching human and animal effigies to some bowls and bottles. Elite Mississippians lived in substantial, rectangular houses atop large platform mounds. Excavations of their houses revealed burned clay wall fragments, indicating that they decorated their walls with murals. They lived year-round in large communities, some of which had defensive palisades, which had been established for centuries. An average Fort Ancient or Mississippian town had about 2,000 inhabitants. Some people lived on smaller farms and in hamlets. Larger towns, centered on mounds and plazas, were ceremonial and administrative centers; they were located near the Mississippi and Ohio River valleys and their tributaries: rivers with large floodplains.

A Mississippian culture developed in western Kentucky and the surrounding area, while a Fort Ancient culture dominated in the eastern portion of what became Kentucky. While the two cultures are similar in numerous ways, the Fort Ancient culture didn't have the temple mounds and chiefs' houses like the Mississippian culture had.

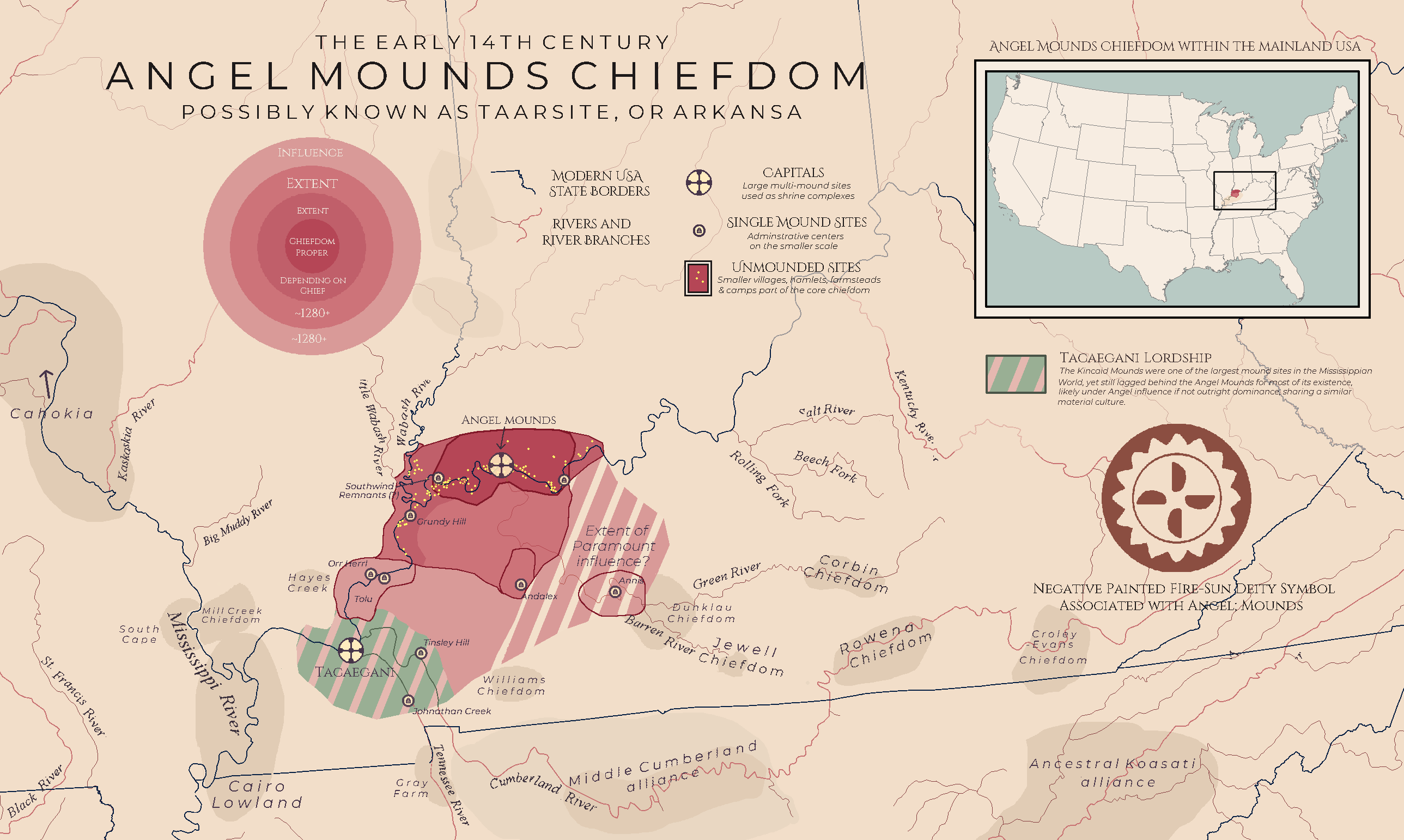
Map of the polity centered at the Angel Mounds site.

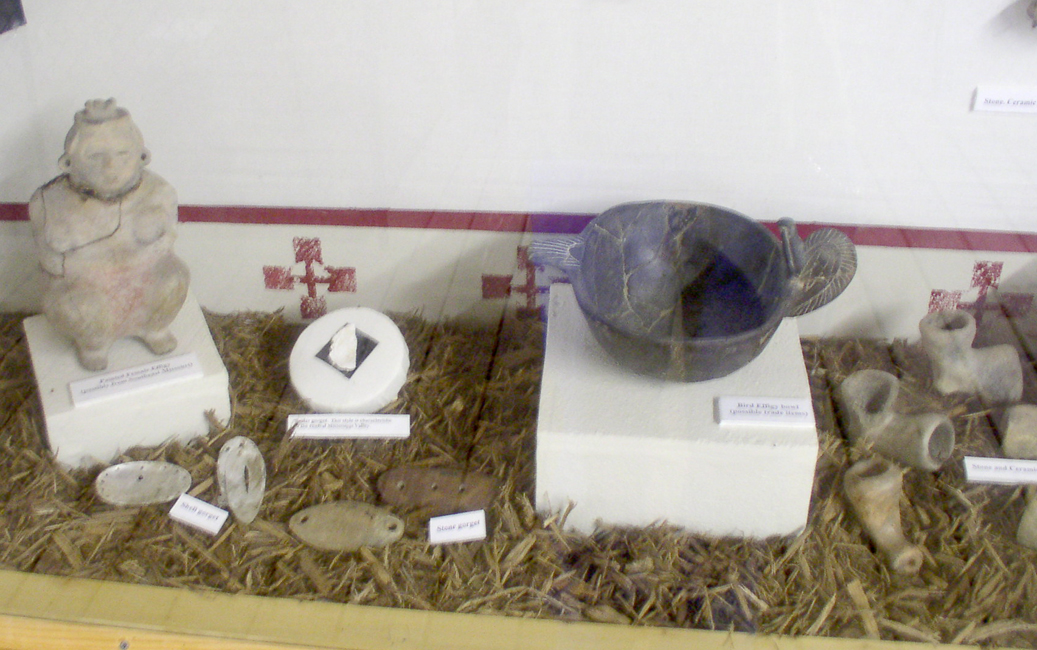
Mississippian culture pottery from the Wickliffe Mounds site in western Kentucky, including a human effigy pot.

Mississippian sites in western Kentucky are at Adams, Backusburg, Canton, Chambers, Jonathan Creek, McLeod's Bluff, Rowlandtown, Sassafras Ridge, Turk, Twin Mounds and Wickliffe. The Wickliffe Mounds in western Kentucky were home to people from 1000 to 1350 CE. The site had two large platform mounds and eight smaller mounds arranged around a central plaza. The people traded with communities in North Carolina, Wisconsin, and the Gulf of Mexico, and their society was led by a hereditary chief. The Rowlandton Mound Site was inhabited from 1100 to 1350. The 2.4-acre (0.97 ha) Rowlandton Mound Site has a large platform mound and an associated village area, similar to the Wickliffe Mounds; these settlements were probably established by Late Woodland peoples. The Tolu Site was inhabited by Kentucky natives from 1200 to 1450 CE. It originally had three mounds: a burial mound, a substructure platform mound, and another mound of unknown function. The site has a central plaza and a large, 6.6-foot-deep (2.0 m) midden. A rare Cahokia-made Missouri flint clay 7-inch (180 mm) human-effigy pipe was found at this site. The Marshall Site was inhabited from 900 to 1300 CE, and the Turk and Adams sites from 1100 to 1500.

The various sites mentioned were at various times under the sway of the Angel Chiefdom. Originally founded by a Cahokian-derived movement just before 1050, the rise of the Angel Chiefdom and its "Great Sun," or "Prince" was marked by the alignments of buildings and temple mounds in sites like Tolu and Annis to the so-called "Angel Axis," the orientation of the Angel Mounds to a specific lunar movement.

The Slack Farm, inhabited from 1400 to 1650, had a mound and a large village. One thousand or more people could have been buried at the site's seven cemeteries, and some were buried in stone box graves. Native Americans abandoned a large, late-Mississippian village at Petersburg which had at least two periods of habitation: 1150 and 1400.

The decline of the Mississippian culture coincided with the arrival of European explorers in the Southeast. By the time Hernando de Soto's expedition traversed the region in the 1540s, many Mississippian societies had already begun to decline, a process exacerbated by the introduction of European diseases and other disruptive factors. Seventeenth-century French explorers documented a number of tribes living in Kentucky until the Beaver Wars in the 1670s including the Cherokee (in southeastern Kentucky caves and along the Cumberland River); the Chickasaw, in the western Jackson Purchase area (especially along the Tennessee River); the Delaware (Lenape) and Mosopelea (at the mouth of the Cumberland River); the Shawnee (throughout the state), and the Wyandot and Yuchi (on the Green River). Hunting bands of Iroquois, Illinois, Lenape and Miami also visited Kentucky.

== Early European exploration and initial contact (1600–1669) ==
Between 1600 and 1669, European exploration and contact with Native Americans in the Kentucky region were limited and mainly indirect. At the time, Kentucky was primarily used as hunting grounds by several Native groups, including the Shawnee, Cherokee, and Chickasaw, rather than as a place for permanent villages. Early European explorers—mostly French traders and missionaries—sometimes traveled through the area while moving along the Ohio River from Canada and the Great Lakes. These trips were part of France's efforts to build trade networks and form alliances with Native peoples. Although Kentucky wasn't deeply explored or settled by Europeans during this time, French contact with tribes nearby began to affect the region. Native groups started using European goods like metal tools, guns, and cloth, which led to changes in daily life, new alliances, and more conflicts between tribes over access to trade.

The Fort Ancient culture, which had been the main culture in northern Kentucky and southern Ohio, fell apart—most likely because of disease, war, and major disruptions caused by indirect contact with European trade networks. Their villages and ceremonial centers were abandoned, and by the mid-1600s, there were no large, permanent Indigenous settlements left in Kentucky.

=== Beaver Wars and Iroquois dominance ===
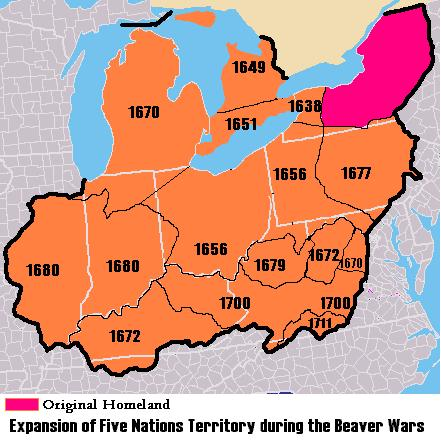
Map of the Iroquois expansion during the Beaver Wars, 1638–1711

The Beaver Wars (c. 1600 – c. 1701) erupted as the Iroquois Confederacy— consisting of the Mohawk, Oneida, Onondaga, Cayuga, and Seneca—sought richer beaver hunting grounds for trade. Fueled by European demand, they leveraged Dutch and English firearms to wage organized campaigns against Algonquian-speaking peoples including the Huron, Erie, and Susquehannock. These offensives aimed to control hunting grounds, monopolize trade routes, and displace rivals. Through a mix of diplomacy and force, the Iroquois reshaped alliances into a centralized power able to negotiate directly with European traders.

Villages were razed or forced to migrate, new confederacies emerged, and regions around the upper Great Lakes and Ohio Valley fell under Iroquois hegemony. In 1701, the Five Nations negotiated the Great Peace of Montreal, ending large-scale hostilities; that same year, the Nanfan Treaty sought to formalize their territorial claims west of the Appalachian Mountains with the British Empire. Though the British never enforced its boundaries, the treaty highlighted the Iroquois’ rise as a colonial powerbroker, reshaping northeastern and mid-Atlantic politics for decades.

The Nanfan Treaty, signed at Albany on July 19, 1701, ended the Beaver Wars by ceding the Iroquois Confederacy|Iroquois’ western New York and trans-Appalachian hunting lands—including areas as far as modern Chicago—to the British. It recognized British authority over these territories, provided formal title for later negotiations, and established peace in the Ohio Valley and Kentucky borderlands.

=== The Eskippakithiki settlement ===
Archaeological evidence indicates that following the Beaver Wars, there were no major Native American settlements in Kentucky for about 50 years, until the establishment of Eskippakithiki. Historians do not think that singular settlement is part of a continuous Kentuckian Native American culture, but rather that it was transplanted from elsewhere, possibly a separatist band from one of the Shawnee towns along the Scioto River in Ohio, or a late Shawnee migration from eastern North Carolina.

Eskippakithiki (contemporary Indian Old Fields), was Kentucky's last Native American (Shawnee) village, in the eastern portion of present-day Clark County, in the north central portion of the state. The name translates as "place of blue licks", in reference to the salt licks nearby. It existed from 1718 to 1754. A 1736 French census reported Eskippakithiki's population as two hundred families.

Eskippakithiki had a population of eight hundred to one thousand. The town was protected by a stout stockade some two hundred yards in diameter, and it was surrounded by three thousand five hundred acres (1,400 ha) of land that had been cleared for crops.

John Finley, a compatriot of Daniel Boone, lived and traded in Eskippakithiki in 1752. Finley said that he was attacked by a party of 50 Christian Conewago and Ottawa Indians, a white French Canadian and renegade Dutchman Philip Philips (all from the St. Lawrence River) who were on a scalp-hunting expedition against southern tribes on January 28, 1753, on the Warrior's Path 25 miles (40 km) south of Eskippakithiki, near the head of Station Camp Creek in Estill County. Major William Trent wrote a letter which first mentions "Kentucky" about the attack on Finley:

I have received a letter just now from Mr. Croghan, wherein he acquaints me that fifty-odd Ottawas, Conewagos, one Dutchman, and one of the Six Nations, that was their captain, met with some of our people at a place called Kentucky on this side Allegheny river, about one hundred and fifty miles (240 km) from the Lower Shawnee Town. They took eight prisoners, five belonging to Mr. Croghan and me, the others to Lowry; they took three or four hundred pounds worth of goods from us; one of them made his escape after he had been a prisoner three days. Three of John Findley's men are killed by the Little Pict Town, and no account of himself ... There was one Frenchman in the Company.

— Lucien Beckner

Seven Pennsylvanian traders were in Finley's crew along with a Cherokee slave. The traders shot at the natives, who took them prisoner and brought them to Canada; some were then shipped to France as prisoners of war. Finley fled, and the next European who went to Eskippakithiki found the town burned to the ground.

== French colonial period (1669–1763) ==
=== Early exploration ===
Before 1763, the entire trans-Appalachian region—including the area later known as "Kentucke country" and much beyond—was part of Louisiana, an administrative district within the broader territory of New France. France was the first European country to claim land in North America located west of the Appalachians, east of the Mississippi River, and south of the Great Lakes. Two early French visits to the general area are recorded: one by René-Robert Cavelier, Sieur de La Salle at the falls of the Ohio River in 1669, and another by Jacques Marquette and Louis Jolliet at the mouth of the Ohio River on the Mississippi in 1673.

On September 1, 1671, Thomas Batts, Thomas Wood, and Robert Fallam (also known as Robert Hallom) began a horseback expedition from Appomattox, Virginia. They were acting under orders from Colonel Abraham Wood to explore rivers west of the Appalachian Mountains. Although it's unclear how far west they actually traveled, they are credited with discovering Wood's River, now called the New River, a tributary of the Kanawha River. Some historians think they may have reached the Guyandotte River basin, or even the Tug Fork area of the Big Sandy River in what is now eastern Kentucky. Due to growing impatience among their Native guides, they returned to Fort Henry in Virginia by October 1. Later, the Kanawha River, the New River, and surrounding lands were considered part of the region south of the Ohio River that Native Americans called Kentucke.

On May 17, 1673, English explorers Gabriel Arthur and James Needham were sent by Abraham Wood from Fort Henry (now Petersburg, Virginia) with four horses and several Cherokee and Native American slaves. Their mission was to reach the Tomahittan (possibly the Yuchi) and travel to the Cherokee capital of Chota (in what is now Tennessee) on the Hiwassee River to learn the Cherokee language. The English wanted to build direct trade relations for the beaver fur trade and avoid using the Occaneechi traders, who acted as middlemen on the Cherokee Trading Path. On the return trip, Needham had an argument with his Occaneechi guide, "Indian John," which turned into a violent fight that ended with Needham's death. Afterward, Indian John tried to convince the Tomahittan to kill Arthur, but instead, the chief adopted him.

For about a year, Arthur—dressed like a Tomahittan in Chota—traveled with the Tomahittan chief and his war parties on revenge raids against Spanish settlements in Florida. These raids were in response to the killing and capture of ten Tomahittan men during a peaceful trading trip several years earlier.

When the Tomahittan attacked the Shawnee in the Ohio River valley, Arthur was wounded by an arrow and taken prisoner. He was nearly burned at the stake in a ritual execution, but a sympathetic Shawnee saved him. After learning that Arthur had married a Tomahittan woman named "Hannah Rebecca" Nikitie, the Shawnee treated his wound, returned his gun, gave him rokahamoney (hominy) to eat, and showed him the trail back to Chota. Most historians believe this route was the Warriors' Path, which crossed the Ohio River at the mouth of the Scioto River, continued south across the Red River branch of the Kentucky River, then followed Station Camp Creek and passed through the Ouasiota Pass into the Ouasiota Mountains.

In June 1674 (or possibly 1678), the Tomahittan chief led Arthur back to his English settlement in Virginia. Arthur's descriptions of the land and its tribes provided the first detailed English accounts of Kentucky. He was among the first Englishmen—after Batts and Fallam—to visit what is now West Virginia and to cross through the Cumberland Gap.

=== Hiatus and later exploration ===
After Arthur and Needham, few detailed records exist of Europeans in Kentucke for several decades, though some traders and explorers likely passed through. In 1739, Frenchman Charles III Le Moyne led a military expedition down the Ohio River and discovered Big Bone Lick, a site known for large fossils, a few miles east of the river in northern Kentucke. In 1744, English fur trader Robert Smith, working along the Great Miami River, visited the same site and confirmed Le Moyne's discovery with more findings. Although these trips were important, they were probably not the first since Arthur and Needham, as other undocumented European visits may have happened during the years in between.

In 1750 and 1751, English Virginians Dr. Thomas Walker and Christopher Gist conducted the first surveys of eastern and northern Kentucky. Walker is sometimes credited as the first European to travel through the Cumberland Gap. In October 1750, an Ohio Company expedition led by Gist took a route through Pound Gap, north of Walker's path, starting from what is now West Virginia. However, Walker wrote in his journal that in 1748 he met Samuel Stalnaker, a Virginia frontiersman living on the Holston River, who traded with the Cherokee in Kentucky through the Cumberland Gap. Stalnaker was the source of Walker's knowledge of the gap. Other explorers who came before Daniel Boone’s famous trips in the 1760s include John Findley, a trader in 1752; James McBride in 1754 (whom historian John Filson called the "Discoverer of Kentucke"); and Elisha Wallen, a long hunter in 1762.

From the time New France was established, there were overlapping claims to the land south of the Ohio River, including the area that would become Kentucky. Competing claims came from France, the British Crown through the Virginia Colony's royal charter, the Shawnee and allied Algonquian tribes of the Ohio Country, the Iroquois Confederacy to the north, and the Cherokee, Muscogee, and other southern tribes. France lost its claim to Kentucky after its defeat in the French and Indian War and the signing of the Treaty of Paris in 1763. The Shawnee, Iroquois, and other Ohio Valley tribes had secured control of their hunting grounds by the Treaty of Easton in 1758, which also barred colonial settlement west of the Allegheny Mountains. Under the Royal Proclamation of 1763, Kentucky became part of the Indian Reserve, which included all trans-Appalachian lands Britain had gained in the treaty.

== British colonial period (1763–1776) ==
The Nanfan Treaty of 1701 had only ceded Iroquois claims north of the Ohio River. The British purchased the Iroquois claim to much of present-day Kentucky in the 1768 Treaty of Fort Stanwix. The 1770 Treaty of Lochaber, followed by an inaccurate survey that established Donelson's Indian Line, transferred Cherokee claims to a large portion of northeastern Kentucky and marked the boundary between Cherokee lands and territory open to settlement. Virginia's trans-Appalachian lands—already known as Kentucke country—were officially organized as Botetourt County in 1770 and Fincastle County in 1772, although their authority in practice reached only as far as Fort Pitt and the Allegheny River basin in what is now southwestern Pennsylvania. Frequent clashes between settlers and Native Americans in the region south of the Ohio River—including Kentucky and the Allegheny basin—eventually led to open conflict. Although the British secured land cessions from the Iroquois and Cherokee, other Native nations such as the Shawnee, Mingo, and Delaware continued to claim and use the region, leading to ongoing disputes and resistance.

=== Early Boone expeditions (1767, 1769) ===
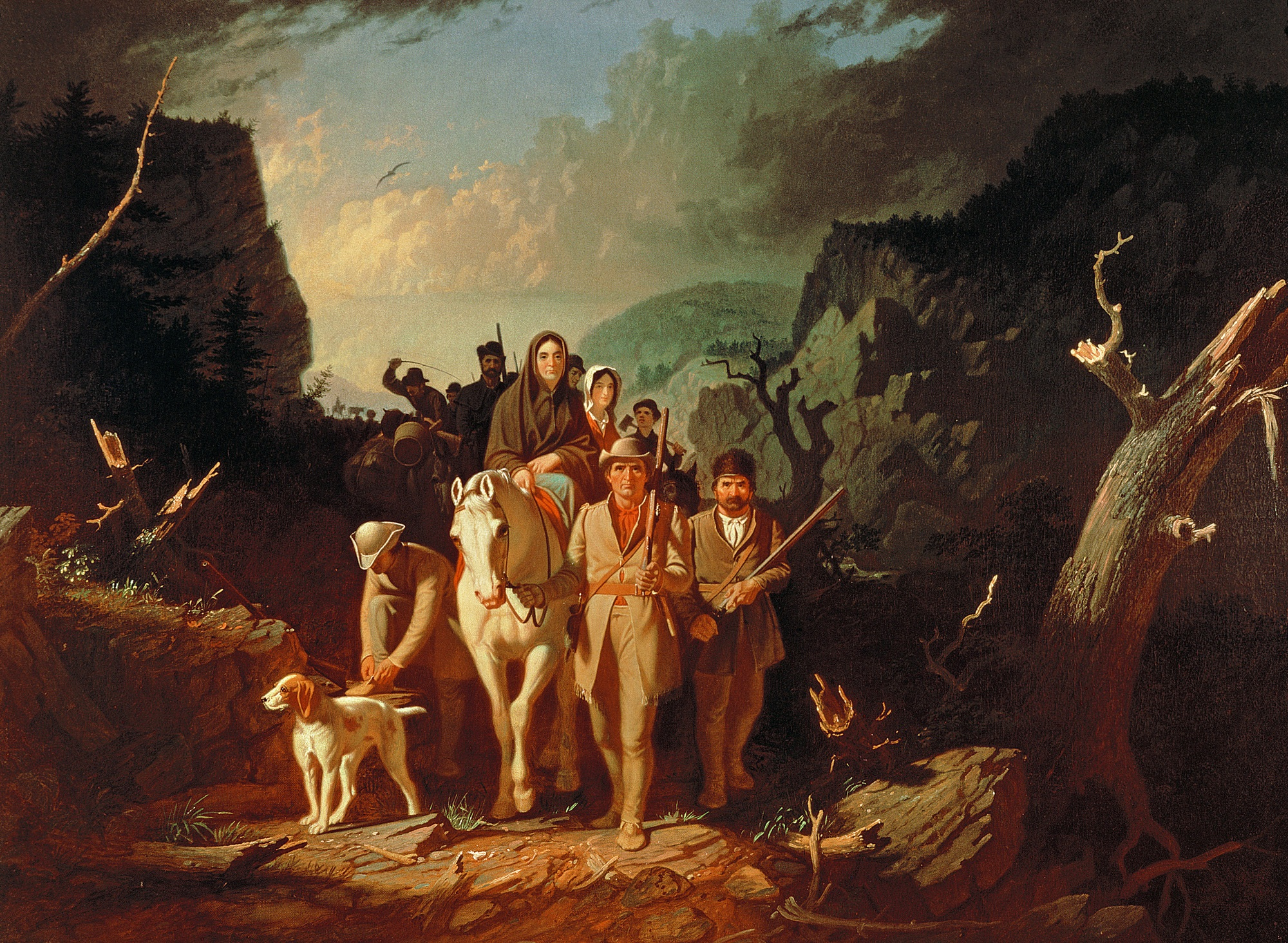
Daniel Boone Escorting Settlers through the Cumberland Gap by George Caleb Bingham

Daniel Boone's first trips into Kentucky helped open the region to Anglo-American settlement. In 1767, he made his first exploratory journey beyond the Appalachian Mountains, likely reaching the Big Sandy River area. Though short and poorly documented, this trip gave Boone his first view of Kentucky and inspired him to return.

In May 1769, Boone and five companions, including John Stewart, (also spelled Stuart) crossed through the Cumberland Gap into Kentucky. They spent the next two years hunting, trapping, and exploring the land. They set up temporary camps and collected furs to sell back in North Carolina.

On December 22, 1769, Boone and Stewart were captured by a Shawnee party, who took their furs and warned them never to return. The Shawnee, along with the Mingo and Delaware, had not signed the 1768 Treaty of Fort Stanwix and still claimed Kentucky as their hunting grounds. They saw Boone's group as trespassers.

Despite the warning, Boone stayed in Kentucky for much of the following year, using his tracking and survival skills to avoid Native patrols. He returned to North Carolina in 1771. In his 1784 narrative, Boone described the happiness and hardships of the expedition:

""Thus situated, many hundred miles from our families in the howling wilderness, I believe few would have equally enjoyed the happiness we experienced. I often observed to my brother, 'You see now how little nature requires to be satisfied. Felicity, the companion of content, is rather found in our own breasts than in the enjoyment of external things; and I firmly believe it requires but a little philosophy to make a man happy in whatsoever state he is. This consists in a full resignation to the will of Providence; and a resigned soul finds pleasure in a path strewed with briars and thorns.'"

These expeditions helped spread word of Kentucky's fertile lands and drew attention from settlers and land speculators, setting the stage for larger migrations before the American Revolution.

=== Early settlements and Lord Dunmore's War ===
Before European settlers arrived, Kentucky was home to Native American nations including the Shawnee, Cherokee, and Iroquois. The early history European settlement of the region involved struggles between these Indigenous groups, British colonial leaders, and settlers pushing westward.

An important event leading to Kentucky's settlement was the Treaty of Fort Stanwix, signed in 1768 between the British and the Iroquois Confederacy. In the treaty, the Iroquois gave up large areas of land south of the Ohio River, including parts of Kentucky. But the Iroquois did not actually live in that area— tribes like the Shawnee and Delaware did— and these tribes did not agree to the treaty. Many Native people rejected the deal and continued to defend their land.

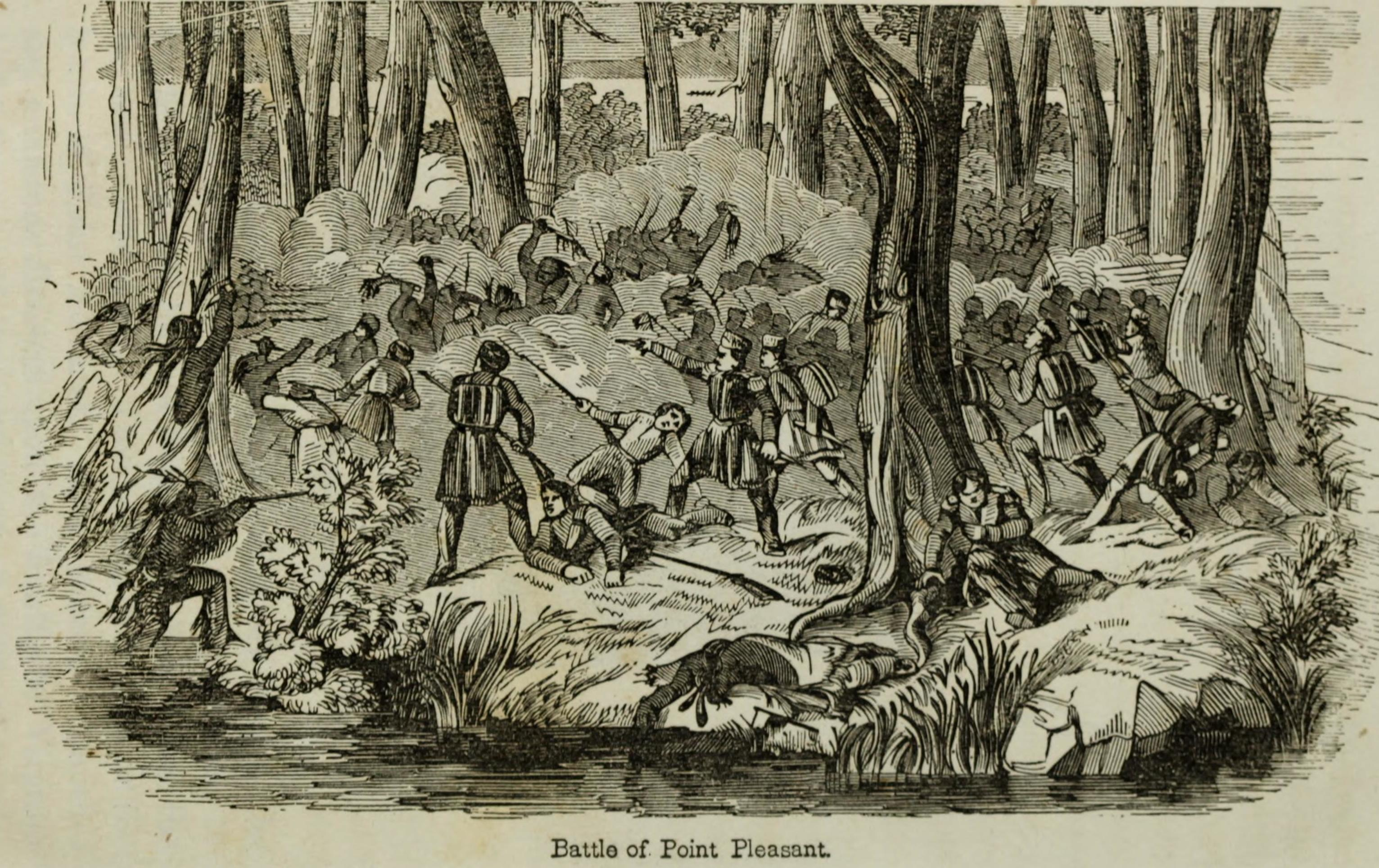
Battle of Point Pleasant

==== Lord Dunmore's War (1774) ====
In 1774, tension between settlers and Native groups led to Lord Dunmore's War, named after the governor of Virginia, Lord Dunmore. He sent troops to fight the Shawnee and Mingo tribes. The war ended with the Battle of Point Pleasant, where Virginia's militia defeated the Shawnee. A treaty signed afterward forced the Shawnee to give up their hunting rights in Kentucky. While this helped Virginia claim the area, many Native people kept fighting against settlers coming into their lands.

==== The Transylvania Purchase and first settlements (1775) ====
In 1775, Richard Henderson and his Transylvania Company made a major land deal with the Cherokee at Sycamore Shoals, in what is now eastern Tennessee. This deal, called the Transylvania Purchase, gave Henderson's company a large area of land that included most of central Kentucky and parts of northern Tennessee. Henderson planned to create a new colony named Transylvania that would be separate from the existing colonies.

Some Cherokee leaders agreed to the sale, but many other Native groups—especially the Shawnee and Chickasaw—did not. They believed the land was theirs and rejected the sale. The governments of Virginia and North Carolina also opposed the deal. At the time, colonial laws did not allow private people or companies to buy land directly from Native tribes. Because of this, both colonies ruled the Transylvania Purchase illegal, and the Transylvania Colony was never officially approved.

Even though the deal was ruled illegal, it helped speed up settlement in Kentucky. Henderson hired Daniel Boone to cut a path through the Cumberland Gap, which became the Wilderness Road. Boone led settlers to start the town of Boonesborough, one of the first permanent settlements in Kentucky. Around the same time, James Harrod had already founded Harrod's Town (Harrodsburg) in 1774. These two towns became important early settlements and marked the beginning of lasting European-American communities in Kentucky, even though conflicts with Native peoples continued.

==== Indigenous resistance ====
Native peoples did not give up their land easily. The Shawnee and their allies continued to fight against the settlers, leading to many attacks and counterattacks in the late 1770s. Early settlement in Kentucky was not peaceful—it was shaped by ongoing conflict between Native nations and those trying to take their land.

In 1775, a group of land investors from North Carolina, led by Richard Henderson, formed the Transylvania Company. They agreed with several Cherokee leaders at Sycamore Shoals to purchase a large area of land in what is now Kentucky and Tennessee. The deal included over 20 million acres. Although the company planned to create a new colony called Transylvania, this agreement went against British law, which banned private land purchases from Native peoples. Virginia and North Carolina later rejected the deal and claimed the land.

Despite this, the Transylvania Company played a significant role in opening Kentucky to settlement. That same year, the company hired Daniel Boone to clear a trail through the Cumberland Gap, a natural pass through the Appalachian Mountains. This trail, known as the Wilderness Road, quickly became the main route used by settlers traveling into Kentucky. Boone and his men also helped build Boonesborough, one of the first permanent American settlements west of the Appalachians.

The company also attempted to set up a government for the colony. In May 1775, settlers met at Boonesborough to create laws for Transylvania, even though the colony was not recognized by any official authority. The effort reflected the settlers' desire for self-government, but Virginia soon took control of the region. In 1776, it turned the land into Kentucky County, part of Virginia.

The Cherokee were divided over the land sale. While some leaders supported the deal, others, including a young war leader named Dragging Canoe, strongly opposed it. His faction broke away and began fighting settlers, leading to years of violent conflict on the frontier.

Although the Transylvania Colony was never officially recognized, its leaders were later compensated with land elsewhere in Kentucky and Tennessee. The Wilderness Road remained a key route west for many years, and by the 1790s, tens of thousands of settlers had traveled along it into Kentucky, helping shape the future of the region.

== Virginia territorial period (1776–1792) ==
=== Kentucky County and District of Kentucky ===
By an act of the Virginia Assembly on December 31, 1776, effective in early 1777, Fincastle County was abolished and its western portion became Kentucky County. The county's government was centered at Harrod's Town; there was no mention of the Transylvania Company's land claims in the legislation. In 1777, Virginia Governor Patrick Henry appointed Colonel John Bowman as County Lieutenant of Kentucky County—a position combining civil and military authority. Bowman arrived later that year to organize local militia and help establish civilian government under Virginia law.

Between 1776 and 1792, Kentucky County was gradually subdivided by the Virginia General Assembly into nine counties to better serve the growing settler population. Despite these divisions, the region was collectively administered as the District of Kentucky, a judicial and military district of Virginia, until Kentucky achieved statehood in 1792. In 1778, the Virginia Assembly formally voided the Transylvania Company's land claims, including those based on the Treaty of Sycamore Shoals on the grounds that private individuals could not legally purchase land from Native American nations. In 1783, North Carolina similarly nullified the portion of the Transylvania land grant located in present-day Tennessee, further invalidating the company's claims.

=== The American Revolution and War for Independence ===
Kentucky was part of the western theater of the American Revolutionary War, and several battles and sieges took place there. A fort at Bryan's Station, in what became Lexington, was built during the first year of the war to defend settlers from attacks by the British and their Native American allies. One of the last major battles of the Revolution, the Battle of Blue Licks, ended in an American defeat.

The Battle of Blue Licks, fought on August 19, 1782, was one of the final battles of the American Revolutionary War. A force of about 180 Kentucky militiamen, led by Colonel John Todd, Lieutenant Colonel Stephen Trigg, and Daniel Boone, pursued a group of retreating Native American and Loyalist fighters near the Licking River. Despite warnings from Boone that it might be a trap, the militia attacked and suffered a devastating ambush, with more than 60 killed. The defeat was a major blow to the Kentucky settlements and highlighted the ongoing dangers in the region even after most of the war had ended.

After the Treaty of Paris was signed in 1783, officially ending the Revolutionary War, there were no major attacks by the Cherokee and their allies in Kentucky, even though the broader Cherokee–American wars continued elsewhere. Fort Nelson, Kentucky's only fort at the time, was abandoned in 1784 after the treaty removed the threat of foreign invasion.

Map of Kentucky published in 1784 with John Filson's The Discovery, Settlement and Present State of Kentucke

=== Cherokee–American wars ===
The Cherokee–American wars, were a series of conflicts from 1776 to 1794 between Cherokee warriors and American settlers in the southeastern United States. These battles arose as Cherokee leaders aimed to resist the encroachment of settlers on their lands.

The outbreak of the American Revolutionary War complicated relations. Cherokee leaders, including Dragging Canoe, opposed settler expansion and allied with British forces, hoping to curtail American encroachment. This alliance led to coordinated attacks on frontier settlements. In response, American militias launched retaliatory expeditions, resulting in the destruction of numerous Cherokee towns and the forced cession of lands through treaties such as the Treaty of DeWitt's Corner in 1777. Despite these setbacks, Dragging Canoe and his followers, known as the Chickamauga Cherokee, continued resistance efforts from new settlements along Chickamauga Creek.

The conflicts continued until 1794, ending with treaties that resulted in major land losses for the Cherokee and opened the way for American settlers to expand into areas such as Kentucky. These wars had a lasting impact on the Cherokee Nation, causing both cultural upheaval and the loss of large parts of their traditional territory.

== Antebellum period (1792–1861) ==
=== Statehood ===
Several factors contributed to the desire of Kentuckians to separate from Virginia. Traveling to the Virginia state capital from Kentucky was long and dangerous. The use of local militias against Indian raids required authorization from the governor of Virginia, and Virginia refused to recognize the importance of Mississippi River trade to Kentucky's economy. It forbade trade with the Spanish colony of New Orleans (which controlled the mouth of the Mississippi), important to Kentucky communities.

Problems increased with rapid population growth in Kentucky, leading Colonel Benjamin Logan to call a constitutional convention in Danville in 1784. Over the next several years, nine more conventions were held. During one, General James Wilkinson unsuccessfully proposed secession from Virginia and the United States to become a Spanish possession.

In 1788, Virginia consented to Kentucky statehood with two enabling acts, the second of which required the Confederation Congress to admit Kentucky into the United States by July 4, 1788. A committee of the whole recommended that Kentucky be admitted, and the United States Congress took up the question of Kentucky statehood on July 3. One day earlier, however, Congress had learned about New Hampshire's ratification of the proposed Constitution (establishing it as the new framework of governance for the United States). Congress considered it "unadvisable" to admit Kentucky "under the Articles of Confederation" but not "under the Constitution", and resolved:

That the said Legislature and the inhabitants of the district aforesaid [Kentucky] be informed, that as the constitution of the United States is now ratified, Congress think it unadviseable [sic] to adopt any further measures for admitting the district of Kentucky into the federal Union as an independent member thereof under the Articles of Confederation and perpetual Union; but that Congress thinking it expedient that the said district be made a separate State and member of the Union as soon after proceedings shall commence under the said constitution as circumstances shall permit, recommend it to the said legislature and to the inhabitants of the said district so to alter their acts and resolutions relative to the premisses [sic] as to render them conformable to the provisions made in the said constitution to the End that no impediment may be in the way of the speedy accomplishment of this important business.

Post-Revolutionary War patriot colonels that were given land bounties by Virginia, and chartered company colonels (land speculators) came together in 1791 to select their fellow, Colonel Isaac Shelby as the secessionist state governor who owned land claims in the Kentucky District dating back to 1775 when he worked as a surveyor for the Transylvania Company.

Kentucky's final push for statehood (now under the US Constitution) began with an April 1792 convention, again in Danville. Delegates drafted the first Kentucky Constitution and submitted it to Congress. On June 1, 1792, Kentucky was admitted to the US as its fifteenth state.

==== The 1792 Constitution ====
The 1792 Constitution of Kentucky established the state's foundational legal framework upon its admission to the Union. It delineated a tripartite system of government, comprising executive, legislative, and judicial branches, mirroring the federal structure. The legislative branch, known as the General Assembly, was bicameral, consisting of a House of Representatives and a Senate. This constitution also included a bill of rights to safeguard individual liberties. Representation within the General Assembly was determined based on population, ensuring proportional representation for the state's citizens. Additionally, the constitution mandated that legislative voting be conducted by ballot rather than voice, aiming to protect the integrity and confidentiality of the legislative process.

The 1792 Constitution entrenched the institution of slavery within the state. Provisions were included that protected the rights of slaveholders, reflecting the prevailing societal norms and economic interests of the time. This inclusion underscored the complexities and contradictions within early American democratic ideals, where the pursuit of liberty coexisted with the perpetuation of slavery.

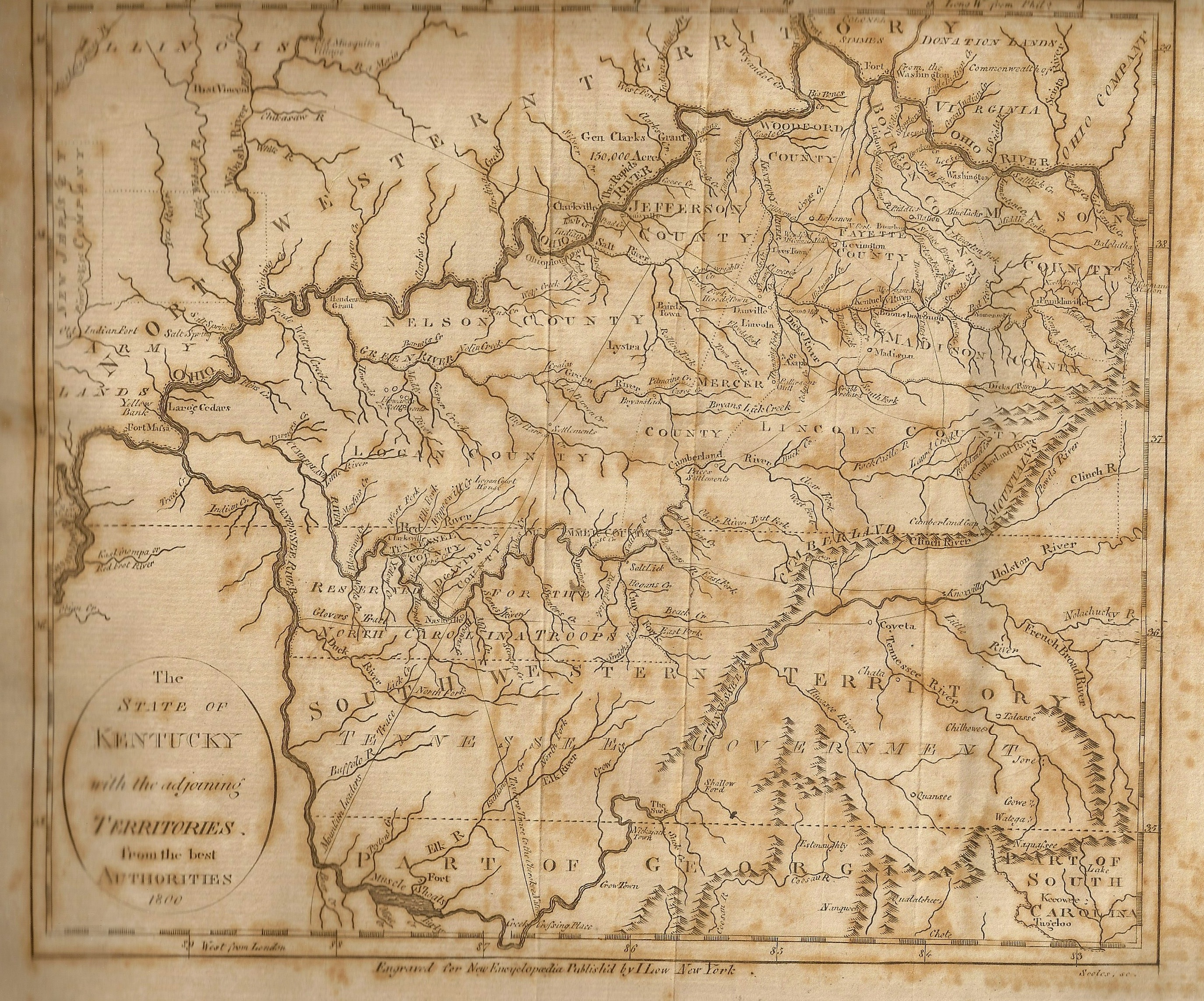
An 1800 Low's Encyclopaedia map of Kentucky and surrounding region did not include southwestern Kentucky and West Tennessee, which were held by the Chickasaw until 1818.

=== Jackson purchase ===
The portion of south of Ohio lands west of the Tennessee River had not been included in the cession of Iroquois lands in the Treaty of Fort Stanwix, 1768, because the Iroquois did not claim that area. Kentucky and Tennessee west of the Tennessee River were recognized by the United States as Chickasaw hunting grounds by the 1786 Treaty of Hopewell. The Chickasaw sold the land to the U.S. in 1818 via the Treaty of Tuscaloosa, signed under questionable circumstances due to bribes paid to the Chickasaw signatories. The Kentucky part of the region is still sometimes known as the Jackson Purchase for then General Andrew Jackson, one of the signers of the Treaty. The Tennessee portion is now West Tennessee.

=== Walker Line ===
The Walker Line, surveyed by Dr. Thomas Walker and party in 1779, forms the southern boundary of Kentucky with Tennessee, except for the portion bounding the subsequent Jackson purchase. It was an extension of the original boundary line between the colonies of Virginia and North Carolina westward to the Tennessee River, which was the then western boundary of Kentucky. It was supposed to be the parallel of latitude 36 degrees and 30 minutes north, but the surveyors made an error, not accounting for deflection of the needle (magnetic north is not geographic north) so the terminus on the Tennessee River was 17 miles north of the true parallel.

Kentucky discovered the error in 1803 and attempted to reclaim the sliver of land that included the settlement of Clarksville, then in Tennessee. The states disputed the boundary for many years, until in 1819, Kentucky appointed commissioners to survey and mark the true boundary along the parallel. Tennessee refused to allow settlement north of Kentucky's line until the matter should be settled. In 1818, Kentucky had dispatched two surveyors Robert Alexander and Luke Munsell, to survey the parallel west of the Tennessee River. In 1820, the states appointed a joint commission of the ablest lawyers and judges in each state to settle the treaty. They arrived at the compromise that the Alexander-Munsell survey line, which appeared on early maps as the Munsell Line, would be the boundary west of the Tennessee River to the Mississippi River (i.e. it partitioned the 1818 Jackson Purchase; the Tennessee portion became West Tennessee), and the Walker Line as originally surveyed, the boundary east of the Tennessee River. In between, the boundary line followed the Tennessee River. So today, there is a noticeable zigzag in the western portion of the boundary on Kentucky and Tennessee maps.

Large parts of the boundary remained uncertain until a resurvey of the deviant Walker Line was completed in 1859.

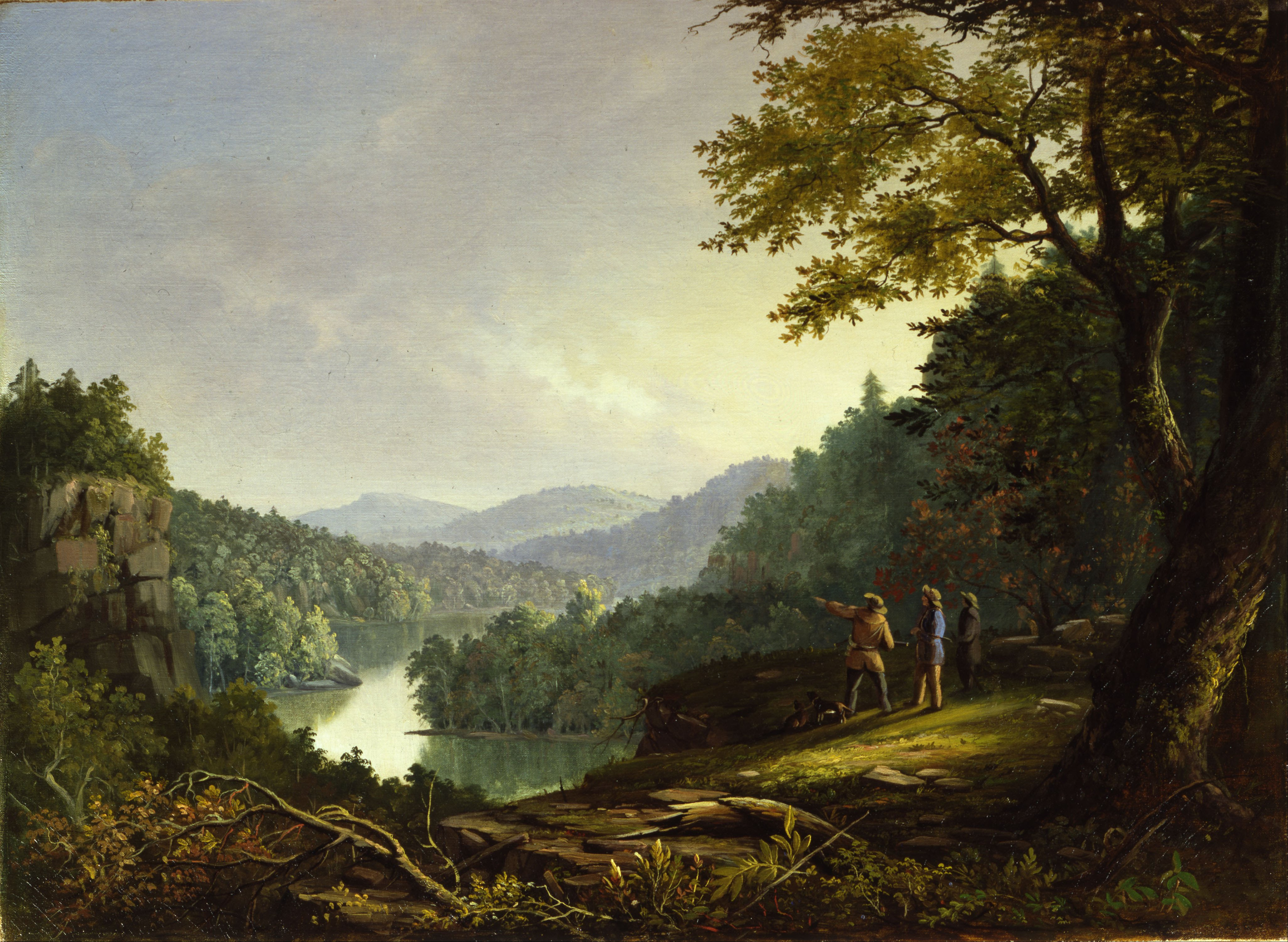
James Pierce Barton's Kentucky Landscape (1832)

=== Economy ===
Land speculation was an important source of income, as the first settlers sold their claims to newcomers for cash and moved further west. Most Kentuckians were farmers who grew most of their own food, using corn to feed hogs and distill into whiskey. They obtained cash from selling burley tobacco, hemp, horses and mules; the hemp was spun and woven for cotton bale making and rope. Tobacco was labor-intensive to cultivate and relied substantially on slave labor on plantations. Planters were attracted to Kentucky from Maryland, North Carolina, and Virginia, where their land was exhausted from tobacco cultivation. Tobacco Plantations in the Bluegrass region and Western Kentucky used slave labor extensively but on a smaller scale more akin to the tobacco plantations in Virginia and North Carolina, than the cotton plantations of the Deep South.

Adequate transportation routes were crucial to Kentucky's economic success in the early antebellum period. The rapid growth of stagecoach roads, canals and railroads during the early 19th century drew many Easterners to the state; towns along the Maysville Road from Washington to Lexington grew rapidly to accommodate demand. Surveyors and cartographers such as David H. Burr (1803–1875), geographer for the U.S. House of Representatives during the 1830s and 1840s, prospered in antebellum Kentucky.

Kentuckians used horses for transportation, labor, breeding, and racing. Taxpayers owned 90,000 horses in 1800; eighty-seven percent of all householders owned at least one horse, and two-thirds owned two or more. Thoroughbreds were bred for racing in the Bluegrass region, and Louisville began hosting the Kentucky Derby at Churchill Downs in 1875.

Mules were more economical to keep than horses, and were well-adapted to small farms as well as larger southern plantations in the state. Mule-breeding became a Kentucky specialty, with many breeders expanding their operations in Missouri after 1865.

=== Lexington and the Bluegrass region ===
Kentucky was mostly rural, but two important cities emerged before the American Civil War: Lexington (the first city settled) and Louisville, which became the largest. Lexington was the center of the Bluegrass region, an agricultural area producing tobacco and hemp. It was also known for the breeding and training of high-quality livestock, including horses. Lexington was the base of many prominent planters, most notably Henry Clay (who led the Whig Party and brokered compromises over slavery). Before the American West was considered to begin west of the Mississippi River, it began at the Appalachian Mountains. With its new Transylvania University Lexington was the region's cultural center, calling itself the "Athens of the West".

This central part of the state had the highest concentration of enslaved African Americans, whose labor supported the tobacco-plantation economy. Many families migrated to Missouri during the early nineteenth century, bringing their culture, slaves, and crops and establishing an area known as "Little Dixie" on the Missouri River.

=== Louisville ===
Louisville was founded during the latter stages of the American Revolutionary War by Virginian soldiers under George Rogers Clark, first at Corn Island in 1778, then Fort-on-Shore and Fort Nelson on the mainland. The town was chartered in 1780 and named Louisville in honor of King Louis XVI of France.

Located at the falls of the Ohio River, Louisville became Kentucky's largest city. The growth of commerce was facilitated by steamboats on the river, and the city had strong trade ties extending down the Mississippi to New Orleans. It developed a large slave market, from which thousands of slaves from the Upper South were sold "downriver" and transported to the Deep South in the domestic slave trade. In addition to river access, railroads helped solidify Louisville's place as Kentucky's commercial center and strengthened east and west trade ties (including the Great Lakes region).

In 1848, Louisville began to attract Irish and German Catholic immigrants. The Irish were fleeing the Great Famine, and German immigrants arrived after the German revolutions of 1848–1849. The Germans created a beer industry in the city, and both communities helped to increase industrialization. Both cities became Democratic strongholds after the Whig Party dissolved.

==== 1855 Louisville riots ====
Nativists made the Irish and Germans unwelcome. They attacked on August 6, 1855. Protestant activists organized into the Know Nothing movement attacked German Irish and Catholic neighborhoods, assaulting individuals, burning and looting. The riots sprang from the bitter rivalry between the Democrats and the nativist Know Nothing party. Multiple street fights raged, leaving 22 to over 100 people dead, scores injured, and much property destroyed by fire. Five people were later indicted; none were convicted, however, and victims were never compensated.

=== Religion and the Great Awakening ===
The Second Great Awakening, based in part on the Kentucky frontier, rapidly increased the number of church members. Revivals and missionaries converted many people to the Baptist, Methodist, Presbyterian and Christian churches.

As part of what is now known as the "Western Revival", thousands of people led by Presbyterian preacher Barton W. Stone came to the Cane Ridge Meeting House in Bourbon County in August 1801. Preaching, singing and conversion went on for a week, until humans and horses ran out of food.

==== Baptists ====
The Baptists flourished in Kentucky, and many had immigrated as a body from Virginia. The Upper Spottsylvania Baptist congregation left Virginia and reached central Kentucky in September 1781 as a group of 500 to 600 people known as "The Travelling Church". Some were slaveholders; among the slaves was Peter Durrett, who helped William Ellis guide the party. Owned by Joseph Craig, Durrett was a Baptist preacher and part of Craig's congregation in 1784.

He founded the First African Baptist Church in Lexington c. 1790: the oldest Black Baptist congregation in Kentucky and the third-oldest in the United States. His successor, London Ferrill, led the church for decades and was so popular in Lexington that his funeral was said to be second in size only to that of Henry Clay. By 1850, the First African Baptist Church was the largest church in Kentucky.

Many abolitionist Virginians moved to Kentucky, making the new state a battleground over slavery. Churches and friends divided over the morality of the issue; in Kentucky, abolitionism was marginalized politically and geographically. Abolitionist Baptists established their own churches in Kentucky around antislavery principles. They saw their cause as allied with Republican ideals of virtue, but pro-slavery Baptists used the boundary between church and state to categorize slavery as a civil matter; acceptance of slavery became Kentucky's dominant Baptist belief. Abolitionist leadership declined through death and emigration, and Baptists in the Upper South solidified their position.

==== Christian Church (Disciples of Christ) ====
During the 1830s, Barton W. Stone (1772–1844) founded the Christian Church (Disciples of Christ) when his followers joined those of Alexander Campbell. Stone broke with his Presbyterian background to form the new sect, which rejected Calvinism, required weekly communion and adult baptism, accepted the Bible as the source of truth, and sought to restore the values of primitive Christianity.

=== New Madrid earthquakes (1811–1812) ===
In late 1811 and early 1812, western Kentucky was heavily damaged by what became known as the New Madrid earthquakes; one was the largest recorded earthquake in the contiguous United States. The earthquakes caused the Mississippi River to change course.

=== War of 1812 ===
Isaac Shelby came out of retirement to lead a squadron into battle. Over 20,000 Kentuckians served in militia units, playing a significant role in the west and in victories in Canada.

=== Mexican-American War ===
Kentucky's enthusiasm for the Mexican–American War was somewhat mixed. Some citizens enthusiastically supported the war, at least in part because they believed that victory would bring new land for the expansion of slavery. Others, particularly Whig supporters of Henry Clay, opposed the war and refused to participate. Young people sought self-identity and a link with heroic ancestors, however, and the state easily met its quota of 2,500 volunteers in 1846 and 1847. Although the war's popularity declined with time, a majority supported it throughout.

Kentucky units won praise at the Battles of Monterey and Buena Vista. Although many soldiers became ill, few died; Kentucky units returned home in triumph. The war weakened the Whig Party, and the Democratic Party became dominant in the state during this period. The party was particularly powerful in the Bluegrass region and other areas with plantations and horse-breeding farms, where planters held the state's greatest number of slaves.

=== Slavery in Kentucky ===
Slavery was a central part of Kentucky's economy and society. Most enslaved people worked on tobacco and hemp farms, but some worked in cities doing trades or household work. Enslaved people in Kentucky faced harsh treatment and few rights. Laws banned them from learning to read or gathering without permission. Some enslaved people resisted by escaping through the Underground Railroad or fighting back, but they faced severe punishment if caught.

Kentucky had mixed views on slavery. The state stayed with the Union during the Civil War, but many leaders supported slavery. Kentucky backed the Fugitive Slave Act of 1850, which forced people to return escaped enslaved people, and local governments helped enforce it.

==== 1848 mass slave escape ====
Edward James "Patrick" Doyle was an Irishman who sought to profit from slavery in Kentucky. Before 1848, Doyle had been arrested in Louisville and charged with attempting to sell free blacks into slavery. Failing in this effort, Doyle tried to make money by offering his services to runaway slaves; requiring payment from each slave, he agreed to guide runaways to freedom. In 1848, he attempted to lead a group of 75 African-American runaway slaves to Ohio. Although the incident has been categorized by some as "the largest single slave uprising in Kentucky history", it was actually an attempted mass escape. The armed runaway slaves went from Fayette County to Bracken County before being confronted by General Lucius Desha of Harrison County and his 100 white male followers. After an exchange of gunfire, 40 slaves ran into the woods and were never caught. The others, including Doyle, were captured and jailed. Doyle was sentenced to twenty years of hard labor in the state penitentiary by the Fayette Circuit Court, and the captured slaves were returned to their owners.

== Civil War (1861–1865) ==
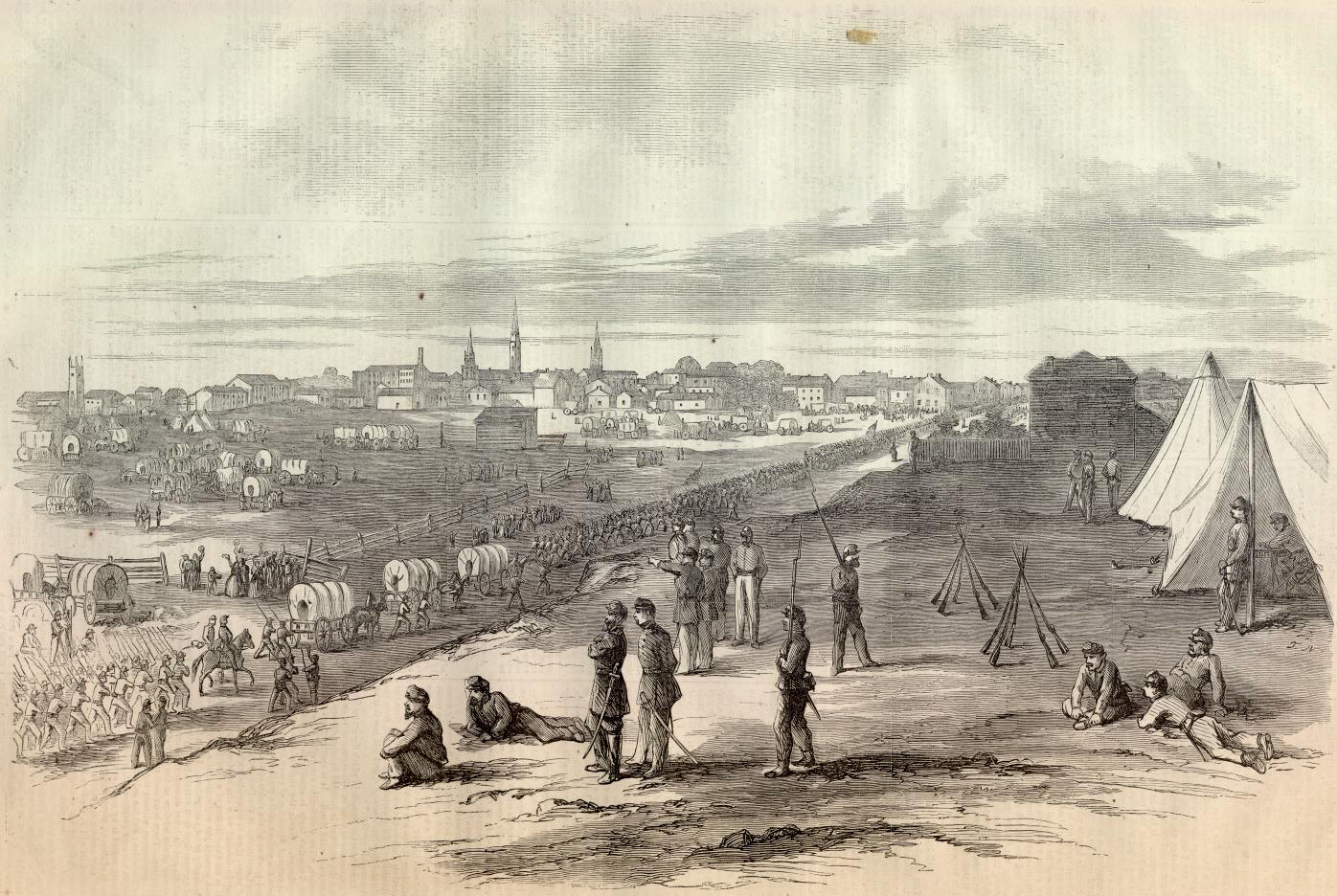
Buell's Army arrives in Louisville September 25, 1862; a week later Buell led 60,000 troops to fight at the Battle of Perryville.

By 1860, Kentucky's population had reached 1,115,684; twenty-five percent were slaves, concentrated in the Bluegrass region, Louisville and Lexington. Louisville and Western Kentucky, which had been a major slave market, shipped many slaves downriver to the Deep South and New Orleans for sale or delivery. Kentucky traded with the eastern and western US as trade routes shifted from the rivers to the railroads and the Great Lakes. Many Kentucky residents had migrated south to Tennessee and west to Missouri, creating family ties with both states. The state voted against secession and remained officially loyal to the Union, although a minority favored the Confederacy.

Kentucky was a border state during the American Civil War, and the state was neutral until a legislature with strong Union sympathies took office on August 5, 1861. Most residents favored the Union. On September 4, 1861, Confederate General Leonidas Polk violated Kentucky neutrality by invading Columbus. As a result of the Confederate invasion, Union general Ulysses S. Grant entered Paducah. The Kentucky state legislature, angered by the Confederate invasion, ordered the Union flag raised over the state capitol in Frankfort on September 7. In November 1861, Southern sympathizers and delegates from 68 of 110 KY counties at the Russellville Convention signed an ordinance of secession, unsuccessfully tried to establish an alternative state government with the goal of secession, joining the Confederacy on December 10, 1861, with Bowling Green as the capital. Though the Confederacy controlled half the state early in the war, Kentucky's partial status as a border Confederate state only lasted three months as Confederates were driven from the state as well as a large portion of Tennessee in February 1862.

On August 13, 1862, Confederate general Edmund Kirby Smith's Army of Tennessee invaded Kentucky; Confederate general Braxton Bragg's Army of Mississippi entered the state on August 28. This began the Kentucky Campaign, also known as the Confederate Heartland Offensive. Although the Confederates won the bloody Battle of Perryville, Bragg retreated because he was in an exposed position; Kentucky remained in Union hands for the remainder of the war.

== Reconstruction period (1865–1876) ==
Although Kentucky was a slave state in the Upper South, it had not seceded, had not joined the Confederacy, and was not subject to military occupation during the Reconstruction era. It was subject to Freedmen's Bureau oversight of new labor contracts and aid to former slaves and their families. A congressional investigation was begun because of issues raised about the propriety of elected officials. During the election of 1865, ratification of the Thirteenth Amendment was a major issue. Although Kentucky opposed the Thirteenth, Fourteenth, and Fifteenth Amendments, the state was obligated to implement them when they were ratified. The Democrats prevailed in the elections.

=== Postwar violence ===
After the war, violence continued in the state. A number of chapters of the Ku Klux Klan formed as insurgent veterans sought to establish white supremacy by intimidation and violence against freedmen and free Blacks. Although the Klan was suppressed by the federal government during the early 1870s, the Frankfort Weekly Commonwealth reported 115 incidents of shooting, lynching, and whipping of blacks by whites between 1867 and 1871. Historian George C. White documented at least 93 lynching deaths of blacks by whites in Kentucky this period, and thought it more likely that at least 117 had taken place (one-third of the state's total number of lynchings).

Northeastern Kentucky had relatively few African Americans, but its whites attempted to drive them out. In 1866, whites in the Gallatin County seat of Warsaw incited a race riot. Over more than a 10-day period in August, a band of more than 500 whites attacked and drove off an estimated 200 Blacks across the Ohio River. In August 1867, whites attacked and drove off blacks in Kenton, Boone, and Grant Counties. Some fled to Covington, seeking shelter at the city's Freedmen's Bureau offices. During the early 1870s, US Marshal Willis Russell of Owen County fought a KKK band which was terrorizing Black people and their white allies in Franklin, Henry and Owen Counties until he was assassinated in 1875. Similar attacks were made on African Americans in western Kentucky, particularly Logan County and Russellville, the county seat. Whites were especially hostile to Black Civil War veterans.

Racial violence increased after Reconstruction period, peaking in the 1890s and extending into the early 20th century. Two-thirds of the state's lynchings of blacks occurred at this time, marked by the mass hanging of four black men in Russellville in 1908 and a white mob's lynching all seven members of the David Walker family near Hickman (in Fulton County) in October of that year. Violence near Reelfoot Lake and the Black Patch Tobacco Wars also received national newspaper coverage.

==== Ku Klux Klan in Kentucky during Reconstruction ====
The Ku Klux Klan (KKK) was active in Kentucky during Reconstruction (1865–1877). Although Kentucky was a border state that remained in the Union during the Civil War, racial tensions and opposition to Reconstruction policies were strong. The Klan's presence in Kentucky reflected broader efforts by white supremacists to resist the political and social changes brought about by the abolition of slavery and the enfranchisement of African Americans. While Kentucky did not experience the same scale of Klan violence as some Deep South states, the organization's activities left a lasting impact on the state's political and social landscape.

The Klan first appeared in Kentucky around 1867 shortly after its founding in Tennessee. It targeted African Americans, Freedmen's Bureau agents, Republicans, and others who supported Reconstruction. The goal was to maintain white dominance by using violence and intimidation to suppress African American political and social rights. Klan members sought to prevent African Americans from voting, holding office, or participating in civic life. The Klan also attacked schools for freedpeople and threatened or harmed teachers working to educate African American children. These attacks were part of a larger effort to reverse the political and social progress African Americans had achieved after the Civil War.

Violent tactics included lynchings, whippings, and other forms of terror designed to prevent African Americans from voting or participating in political life. The Klan also used threats and physical violence to intimidate white Republicans and others who supported racial equality. African American leaders, including ministers and political organizers, were frequently targeted for violence. The Klan's violence was not only political but also economic; African American farmers were sometimes attacked or driven off their land. The Klan's campaign of fear and violence was aimed at undermining the political gains African Americans had made through the 14th and 15th Amendments, which granted citizenship and voting rights to formerly enslaved people.

Although federal authorities attempted to suppress the Klan through the Enforcement Acts (1870–1871), the Klan in Kentucky remained active in certain areas. Federal troops were occasionally sent to Kentucky to protect polling places and enforce federal law, but the Klan's decentralized structure made it difficult to eliminate. Unlike the Deep South, where the Klan operated through a more centralized structure, Klan activity in Kentucky was more localized and fragmented. Small, independent groups operated in rural counties, using local knowledge to evade detection and prosecution. State and local authorities were often reluctant to act against the Klan due to widespread sympathy for its goals and members within the white population.

After the official end of Reconstruction in 1877, the Klan's influence in Kentucky declined, but white supremacist violence and voter suppression continued through other means. The rise of Jim Crow laws and other segregationist policies ensured that African Americans were excluded from political and economic power. Poll taxes, literacy tests, and grandfather clauses were introduced to restrict African American voting rights. Racial violence also continued in the form of mob attacks and lynching. The Klan would later experience a resurgence in the early 20th century as racial tensions and the push for civil rights led to renewed white backlash. The legacy of the Klan's activity during Reconstruction contributed to the long-standing racial divisions and inequalities that persisted in Kentucky well into the 20th century.

==== Hatfield-McCoy and other feuds ====
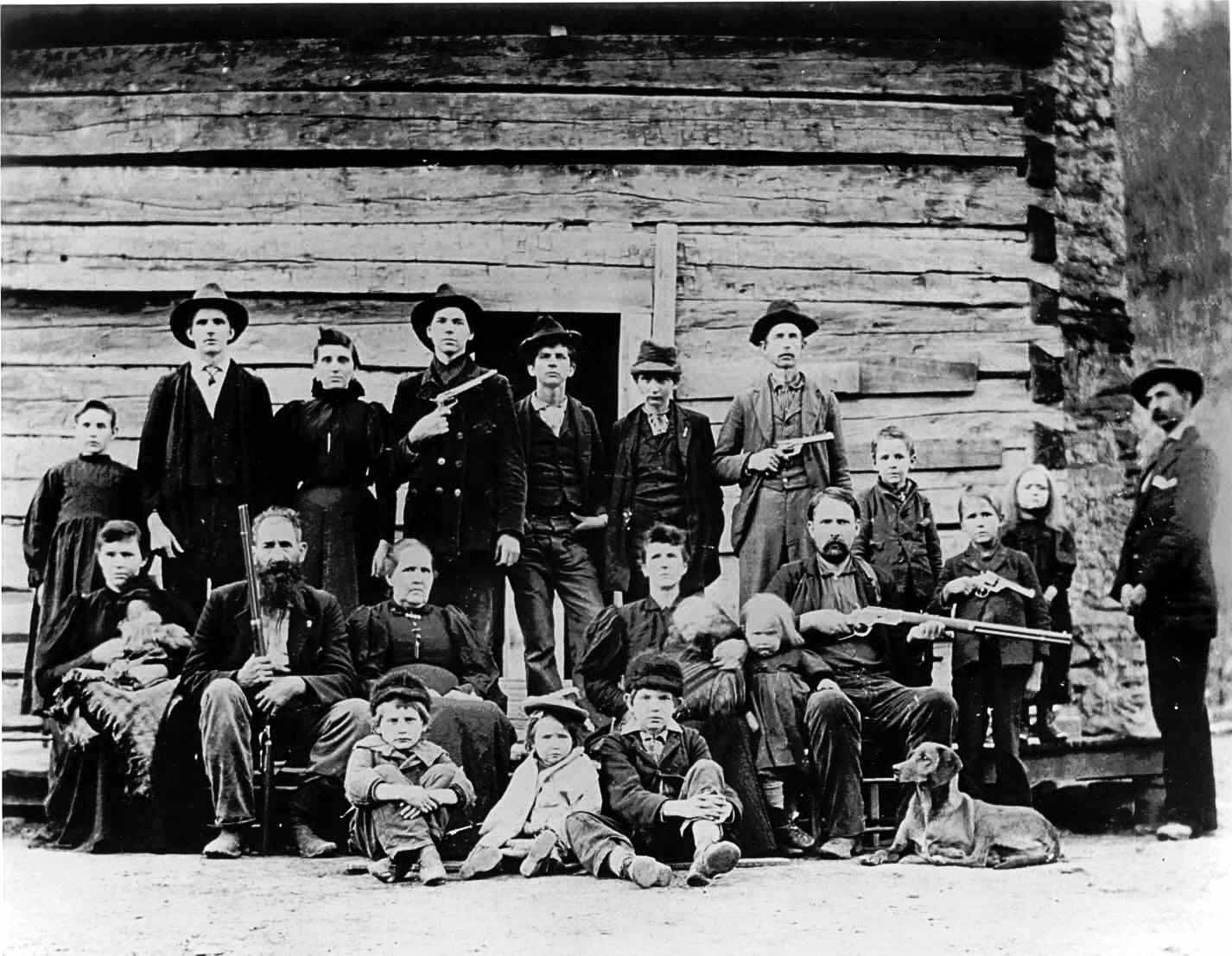
The Hatfield clan in 1897

Kentucky became internationally known in the late 19th century for its violent feuds, especially in the eastern Appalachian mountain communities. Men in extended clans were pitted against each other for decades, often using assassination and arson as weapons with ambushes, gunfights and prearranged shootouts. Some of the feuds were continuations of violent local Civil War episodes. Journalists often wrote about the violence in stereotypical Appalachian terms, interpreting the feuds as the inevitable product of ignorance, poverty, isolation and (perhaps) inbreeding. The leading participants were typically well-to-do local elites with networks of clients who fought at the local level for political power.

The Hatfield–McCoy feud involved two rural American families of the West Virginia–Kentucky border area along the Tug Fork of the Big Sandy River in the years 1878–1890. Some say the 1865 shooting of Asa McCoy as a "traitor" for serving with the Union, was a precursor event. There was a lapse of 13 years until it flared with disputed ownership of a pig that swam across the Tug Fork in 1878 and escalated to shootouts, assassinations, massacres, and a hanging. Approx. 60 Hatfield and McCoy family members, associates, neighbors, law enforcement and others were killed or injured. Eight Hatfields went to prison for murder and other crimes. The feud ended with the hanging of Ellison Mounts, a Hatfield, in Feb. 1890 after being sentenced to death.

== Gilded Age and Progressive era (1870–1920) ==
During the Gilded Age, the women's suffrage movement took hold in Kentucky. Laura Clay, daughter of noted abolitionist Cassius Clay, was the most prominent leader. A prohibition movement also began, which was challenged by distillers (based in the Bluegrass) and saloon-keepers (based in the cities).

Kentucky's hemp industry declined as manila became the world's primary source of rope fiber. This led to an increase in tobacco production, already the state's largest cash crop.

Louisville was the first US city to use a secret ballot. The ballot law, introduced by A. M. Wallace of Louisville, was enacted on February 24, 1888. The act applied only to the city, because the state constitution required voice voting in state elections. The mayor printed the ballots, and candidates had to be nominated by 50 or more voters to have their name placed on the ballot. A blanket ballot was used, with candidates listed alphabetically by surname without political-party designations.

Other state voter laws increased barriers to voter registration, disenfranchising most African Americans and many poor whites with poll taxes, literacy tests and oppressive recordkeeping.

=== Assassination of Governor Goebel 1900 ===
From 1860 to 1900, German immigrants settled in northern Kentucky cities (particularly Louisville). The best-known late-19th-century ethnic-German leader was William Goebel (1856–1900). From his base in Covington, Goebel became a state senator in 1887, fought the railroads, and took control of the state Democratic Party in the mid-1890s. His 1895 election law removed vote-counting from local officials, giving it to state officials controlled by the (Democratic) Kentucky General Assembly.

The election of Republican William S. Taylor as governor was unexpected. The Kentucky Senate formed a committee of inquiry which was packed with Democratic members. As it became apparent to Taylor's supporters that the committee would decide in favor of Goebel, they raised an armed force. On January 19, 1900, more than 1,500 armed civilians took possession of the Capitol. For over two weeks, Kentucky slid towards civil war; the presiding governor declared martial law, and activated the Kentucky militia. On January 30, 1900, Goebel was shot by a sniper as he approached the Capitol. Mortally wounded, Goebel was sworn in as governor the next day and died three days later.

For nearly four months after Goebel's death, Kentucky had two chief executives: Taylor (who insisted that he was the governor) and Democrat J. C. W. Beckham, Goebel's lieutenant governor, who requested federal aid to determine Kentucky's governor. On May 26, 1900, the Supreme Court of the United States upheld the committee's ruling that Goebel was Kentucky's governor and Beckham his successor. After the court's decision, Taylor fled to Indiana. He was indicted as a conspirator in Goebel's assassination; attempts to extradite him failed, and he remained in Indiana until his death.

== World wars and interwar period (1914–1945) ==
Although violence against blacks declined in the early 20th century, it continued – particularly in rural areas, which also experienced other social disruption. African Americans were remained second-class citizens in the state, and many left the state for better-paying jobs and education in Midwestern manufacturing and industrial cities as part of the Great Migration. Rural whites also moved to industrial cities such as Pittsburgh, Chicago and Detroit.

=== World War I and the 1920s ===
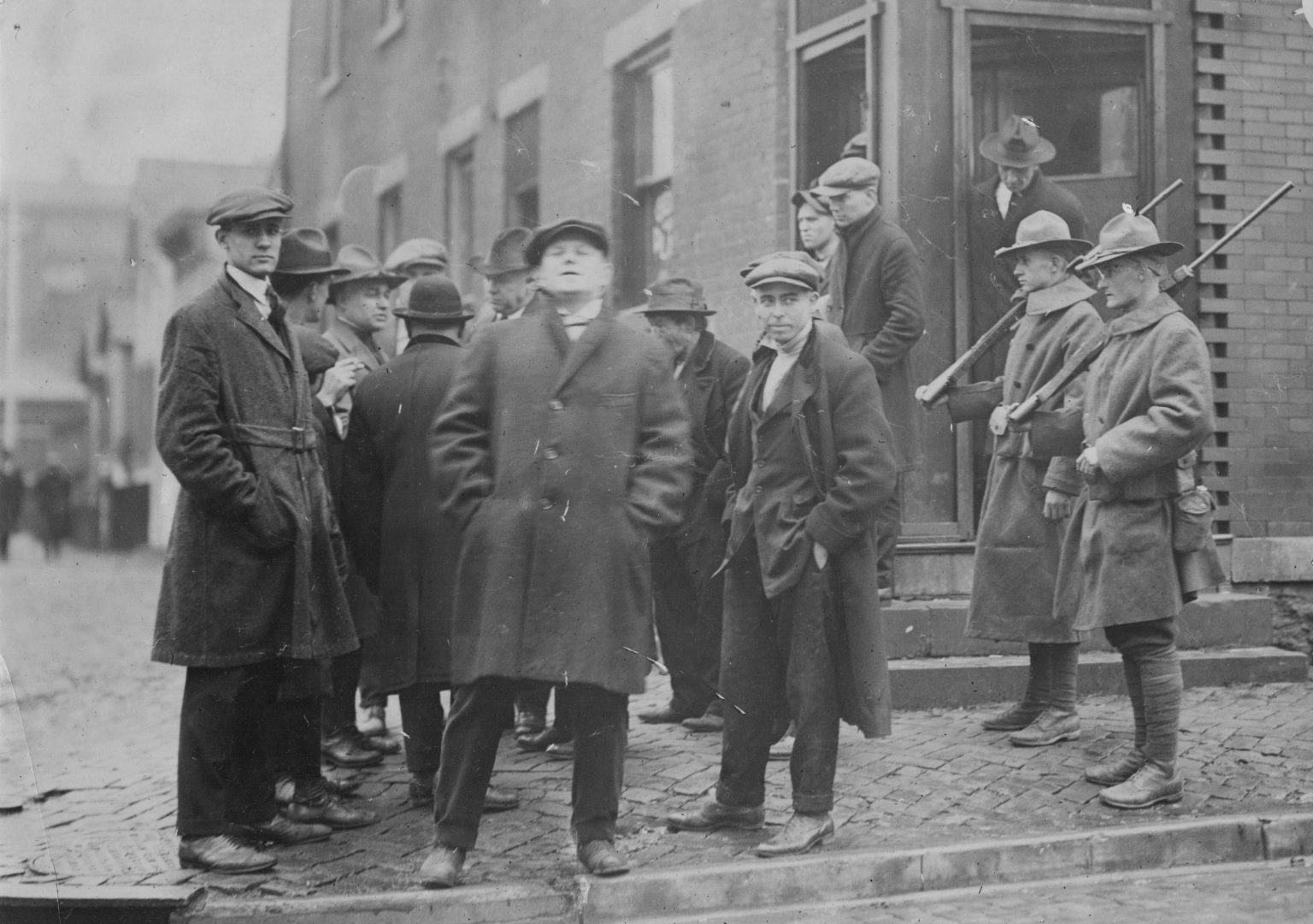
Strike supporters and militia soldiers outside the Newport steel mills, December 1921

Like the rest of the country, Kentucky experienced high inflation during the war years. Infrastructure was created, and the state built many roads in tandem with the increasing use of the automobile. The war also led to the clear-cutting of thousands of acres of Kentucky timber. The tobacco and whiskey industries had boom years during the 1910s, although Prohibition (which began in 1920) seriously harmed the state's economy when the Eighteenth Amendment was enacted. German citizens had established Kentucky's beer industry; a bourbon-based liquor industry already existed, and vineyards had been established during the 18th century in Middle Tennessee. Prohibition resulted in resistance and widespread bootlegging, which continued into mid-century. Eastern Kentucky rural and mountain residents made their own liquor in moonshine stills, selling some across the state.

During the 1920s, progressives attacked gambling. The anti-gambling crusade sprang from religious opposition to machine politics led by Helm Bruce and the Louisville Churchmen's Federation. The reformers had their greatest support in rural Kentucky from chapters of the revived Ku Klux Klan and fundamentalist Protestant clergymen. In its revival after 1915, the KKK supported general social issues (such as gambling prohibition) as it promoted itself as a fraternal organization concerned with public welfare.

Congressman Alben W. Barkley became the spokesman of the anti-gambling group (nearly secured the 1923 Democratic gubernatorial nomination), and crusaded against powerful eastern Kentucky mining interests. In 1926, Barkley was elected to the United States Senate. He became the Senate Democratic leader in 1937, and ran for Vice President with incumbent president Harry S. Truman in 1948.

In 1927, former governor J. C. W. Beckham won the Democratic Party's gubernatorial nomination as the anti-gambling candidate. Urban Democrats deserted Beckham, however, and Republican Flem Sampson was elected. Beckham's defeat ended Kentucky's progressive movement.

=== The Great Depression ===
Like the rest of the country and much of the world, Kentucky experienced widespread unemployment and little economic growth during the Great Depression. Workers in Harlan County fought coal-mine owners to organize unions in the Harlan County War; unions were eventually established, and working conditions improved.

President Franklin D. Roosevelt's New Deal programs resulted in the construction and improvement of the state's infrastructure: rural roads, telephone lines, and rural electrification with the Kentucky Dam and its hydroelectric power plant in western Kentucky. Flood-control projects were built on the Cumberland and Mississippi Rivers, improving the navigability of both.

The 1938 Democratic Senate primary was a showdown between Barkley (liberal spokesman for the New Deal) and conservative governor Happy Chandler. Although Chandler was a gifted orator, Franklin D. Roosevelt's endorsement after federal investment in the state reelected Barkley with 56 percent of the vote. Farmers, labor unions, and cities contributed to Barkley's victory, affirming the New Deal's popularity in Kentucky. A few months later, Barkley appointed Chandler to the state's other Senate seat after the death of Senator M. M. Logan.

==== Ohio River flood of 1937 ====
In January 1937, the Ohio River rose to flood stage for three months. The flood led to river fires when oil tanks in Cincinnati were destroyed. One-third of Kenton and Campbell Counties in Kentucky were submerged, and 70 percent of Louisville was underwater for over a week. Paducah, Owensboro, and other Purchase cities were devastated. Nationwide damage from the flood totaled $20 million in 1937 dollars. The federal and state governments made extensive flood-prevention efforts in the Purchase, including a flood wall in Paducah.

=== World War II ===
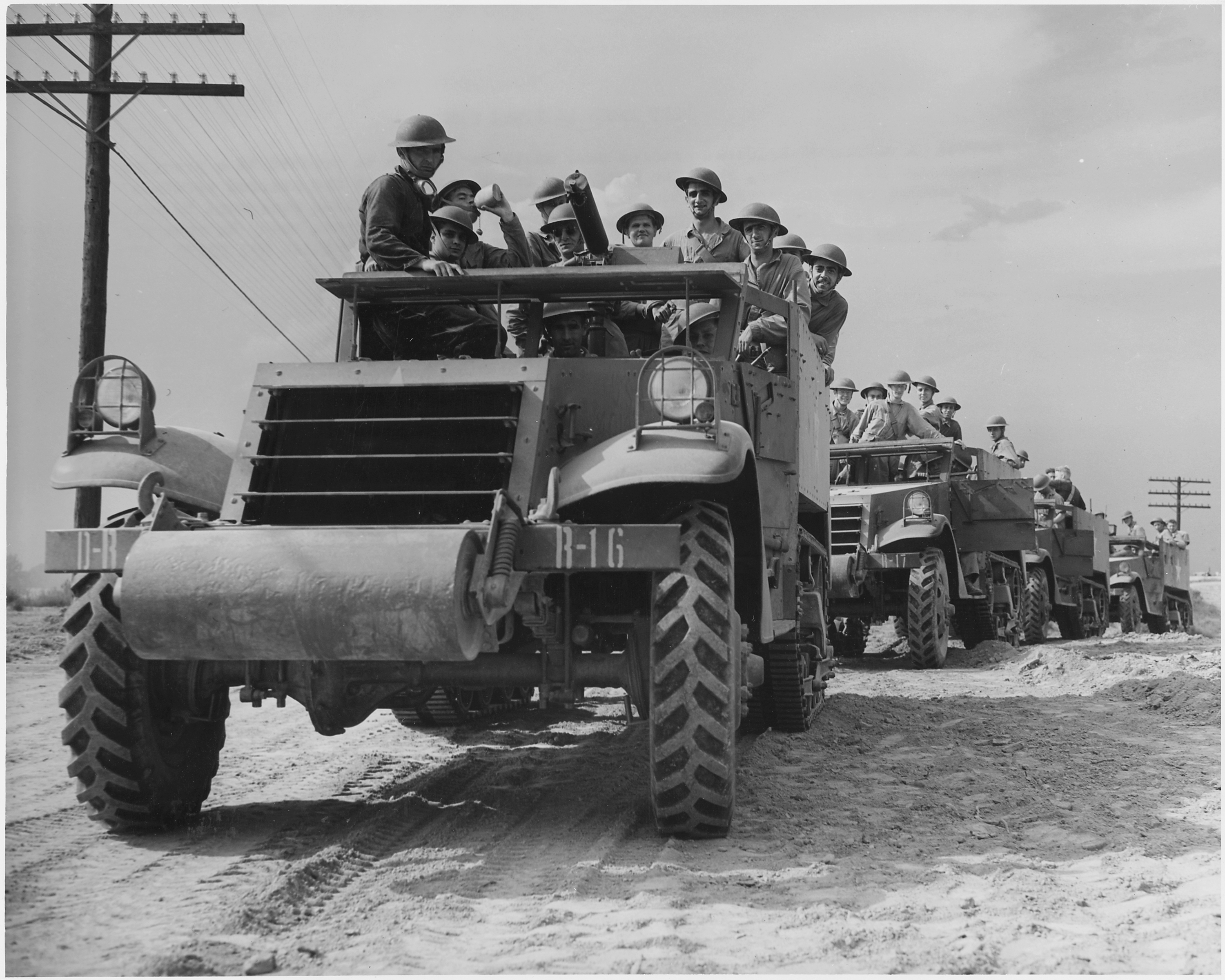
A column of M3 half-tracks and infantry awaiting orders during exercises at Fort Knox, June 1942

==== Domestic economy 1939 to 1945 ====
Kentucky, a heavily rural state, experienced significant transformations in its political, social, and economic landscape. The war pulled the state out of the lingering Great Depression, sparking an economic boom that led to urbanization and industrialization. This, in turn, challenged existing social hierarchies and created new political dynamics. Preparations for war effort were heavily funded by the Federal government starting in 1939 and continuing until early 1945. This spurred a massive economic shift in Kentucky. Initially, the state was unprepared for industrial-level wartime production, but this quickly changed as the federal government sought to mobilize underutilized economic factors, especially in the South. Large numbers of men and women left small family farms to work in the rapidly expanding factories. The state's manufacturing sector re-tooled for military production. The Ford Motor Company plant in Louisville, stopped making cars and instead produced over 93,000 Jeeps for the armed forces. Louisville Slugger made gun stocks, and distilleries shifted from making bourbon to industrial alcohol. Louisville's "Rubbertown" neighborhood became a major producer of synthetic rubber, contributing over a quarter of the nation's supply. Coal production also surged in eastern Kentucky to fuel the war effort.

==== Kentuckians in the war ====
Kentucky sent over 300,000 young men and several thousand women to serve in the armed forces. The state's major military installations, Fort Knox and Fort Campbell, trained hundreds of thousands for recruits from all over the nation. Bowman Field in Louisville became a key training facility for bomber crews and glider pilots. Admiral Husband E. Kimmel of Henderson County commanded the Pacific Fleet when it was destroyed by Japan at Pearl Harbor. Sixty-six men from Harrodsburg were prisoners on the Bataan Death March. Kentucky native Franklin Sousley was one of the men in the photograph of the raising of the flag on Iwo Jima. Harrodsburg resident John Sadler was a POW in Japan during the atomic bombing of Nagasaki. Seven Kentuckians received the Medal of Honor; 7,917 Kentuckians died out of the 306,364 who served.

== Mid-20th century ==
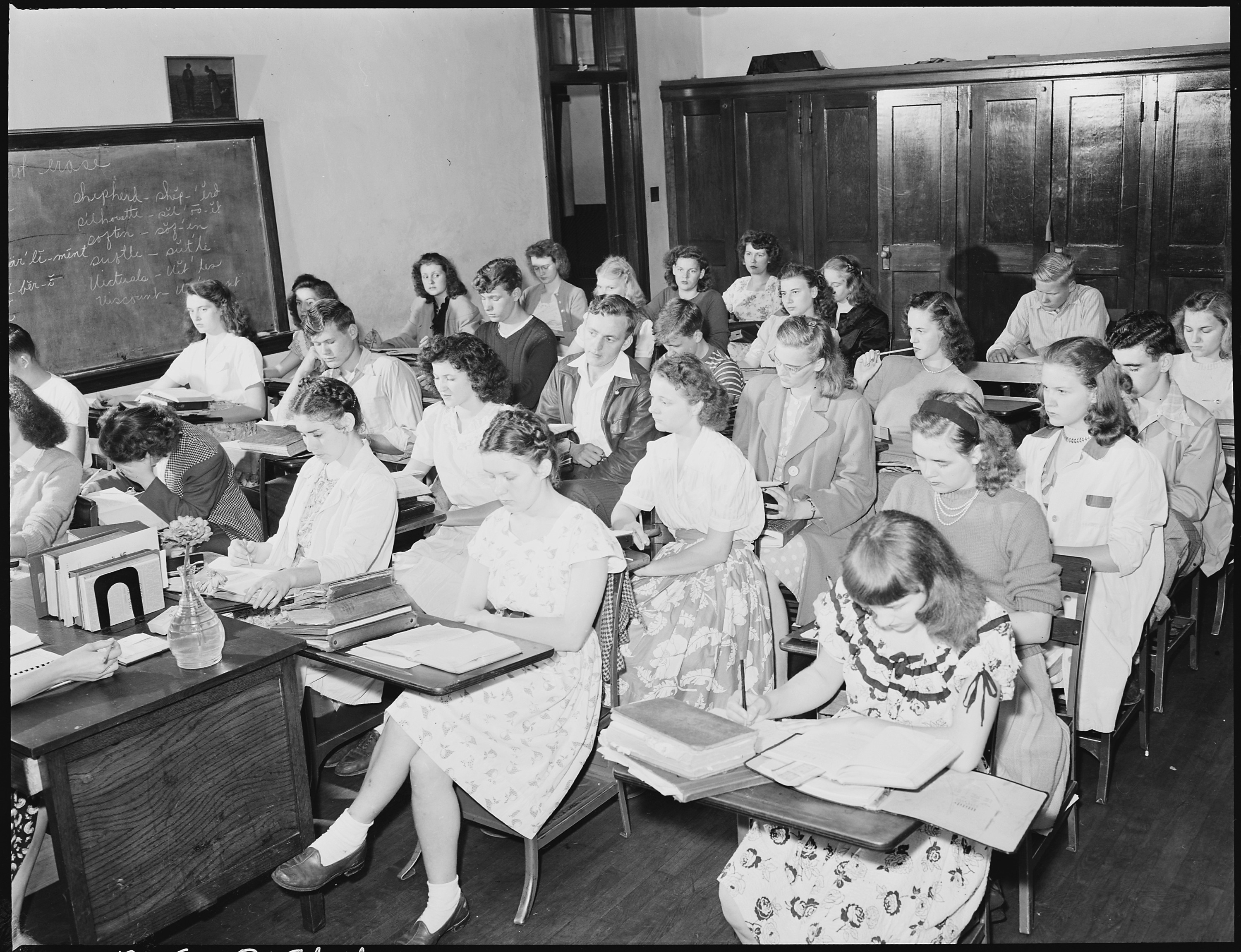
Students at a high school in Wheelwright, Kentucky, September 1946. In the center is George Fain, a World War II veteran completing his final year.

Federal construction of the Interstate Highway System helped connect remote areas of Kentucky. Democrat Lawrence W. Wetherby was governor from 1950 to 1955. Wetherby was considered progressive, solid, and unspectacular. As lieutenant governor under Earle Clements, he succeeded Clements, who was elected U.S. Senator in 1950 and was elected governor in 1951. Wetherby emphasized road improvements, increasing tourism and other economic development. He was one of the few Southern governors to implement desegregation in public schools after the Supreme Court's decision in Brown v. Board of Education (1954), which ruled that segregated schools were unconstitutional. Bert T. Combs, the Democratic primary-winning candidate for governor in 1955, was defeated by Happy Chandler.

Agriculture was replaced in many areas by industry, which stimulated urbanization. By 1970, Kentucky had more urban than rural residents. Tobacco production remained an important part of the state's economy, bolstered by a New Deal legacy which gave a financial advantage to holders of tobacco allotments.

Thirteen percent of Kentucky's population moved out of state during the 1950s, largely for economic reasons. Dwight Yoakam's song, "Readin', Rightin', Route 23", cites local wisdom about avoiding work in the coal mines; U.S. Route 23 runs north through Columbus and Toledo, Ohio, to Michigan's automotive centers.

=== Civil rights ===
African Americans in Kentucky pressed for civil rights, provided by the US Constitution, which they had earned with their service during World War II. During the 1960s, as a result of successful local sit-ins during the civil rights movement, the Woolworth store in Lexington ended racial segregation at its lunch counter and in its restrooms.

Democratic Governor Ned Breathitt took pride in his civil-rights leadership after being elected governor in 1963. In his gubernatorial campaign against Republican Louis Broady Nunn, civil rights and racial desegregation were major campaign issues; Nunn attacked the Fair Services Executive Order, signed by Bertram Thomas Combs and three other governors after conferring with President John F. Kennedy. In 1963, Kentucky Governor Bert T. Combs issued an executive order to desegregate public accommodations in the state. This order also mandated that state contracts be free from discrimination. During his gubernatorial campaign that same year, Louie Nunn criticized this executive order, labeling it as "rule by executive decree." He further pledged that his "first act [would] be to abolish this" order if elected. Breathitt, who said that he would support a bill to eliminate legal discrimination, won the election by 13,000 votes.

After Breathitt was elected governor, the state civil-rights bill was introduced to the General Assembly in 1964. Buried in committee, it was not voted on. "There was a great deal of racial prejudice existing at that time," said Julian Carroll. A rally in support of the bill attracted 10,000 Kentuckians and leaders and allies such as Martin Luther King Jr., Ralph Abernathy, Jackie Robinson, and Peter, Paul and Mary. At the urging of President Lyndon B. Johnson, Breathitt led the National Governors Association in supporting the Civil Rights Act of 1964. Johnson later appointed him to the "To Secure These Rights" commission, charged with implementing the act.

In January 1966, Breathitt signed "the most comprehensive civil rights act ever passed by any state south of the Ohio River in the history of this nation." Martin Luther King Jr. concurred with Breathitt's assessment of Kentucky's sweeping legislation, calling it "the strongest and most important comprehensive civil-rights bill passed by a Southern state." Kentucky's 1966 Civil Rights Act ended racial discrimination in bathrooms, restaurants, swimming pools, and other public places throughout the state. Racial discrimination was prohibited in employment, and Kentucky cities were empowered to enact local laws against housing discrimination. The legislature repealed all "dead-letter" segregation laws (such as the 62-year-old Day Law) on the recommendation of Rep. Jesse Warders, a Louisville Republican and the only Black member of the General Assembly. The act gave the Kentucky Commission on Human Rights enforcement power to resolve discrimination complaints. Breathitt has said that the civil-rights legislation would have passed without him, and thought his opposition to strip mining had more to do with the decline of his political career than his support for civil rights.

==== 1968 Louisville riots ====
Two months after Martin Luther King Jr. was assassinated, riots occurred in Louisville's West End. On May 27, a protest against police brutality at 28th and Greenwood Streets turned violent after city police arrived with guns drawn and protesters reacted. Governor Louie B. Nunn called out the National Guard to suppress the violence. Four hundred seventy-two people were arrested, damage totaled $200,000, and African Americans James Groves Jr. (age 14) and Washington Browder (age 19) were killed. Browder was shot dead by a business owner; Groves was shot in the back after allegedly participating in looting.

== Late 20th century to present ==
Martha Layne Collins was Kentucky's first woman governor from 1983 to 1987, and co-chaired the 1984 Democratic National Convention. A former schoolteacher, Collins had risen up the state's Democratic ranks and was elected lieutenant governor in 1979; in 1983, she defeated Jim Bunning for the governorship. Throughout her public life, Collins emphasized education and economic development; a feminist, she viewed all issues as "women's issues." Collins was proud of acquiring a Toyota plant for Georgetown, which brought a substantial number of jobs to the state.

In June 1989, federal prosecutors announced that 70 men, most from Marion County and some from adjacent Nelson and Washington Counties, had been arrested for organizing a marijuana-trafficking ring which stretched across the Midwest. The conspirators called themselves the "Cornbread Mafia".

Wallace G. Wilkinson signed the Kentucky Education Reform Act (KERA) in 1990, overhauling Kentucky's universal public-education system. The Kentucky legislature passed an amendment allowing the state's governor two consecutive terms. Paul E. Patton, a Democrat, was the first governor eligible to succeed himself; winning a close race in 1995, Patton benefited from economic prosperity and most of his initiatives and priorities were successful. After winning reelection by a large margin in 1999, however, Patton suffered from the state's economic problems and lost popularity from the exposure of an extramarital affair. Near the end of his second term, Patton was accused of abusing patronage and criticized for pardoning four former supporters who had been convicted of violating the state's campaign-finance laws. Patton's successor, Republican Ernie Fletcher, was governor from 2003 to 2007.

In 2000, Kentucky ranked 49th of the 50 U.S. states in the percentage of women in state or national political office. The state has favored "old boys" with political elites, incumbency, and long-entrenched political networks.

Democrat Steve Beshear was elected governor in 2007 and reelected in 2011. In 2015, Beshear was succeeded by Republican Matt Bevin. Bevin lost in 2019 to his predecessor's son and former state attorney general, Andy Beshear.

=== Common Core ===
Kentucky was the first state in the U.S. to adopt Common Core, after the General Assembly passed legislation in April 2009 under Governor Steve Beshear which laid the foundation for the new national standards. In fall 2010, Kentucky's board of education voted to adopt the Common Core verbatim. As the first state to implement Common Core, $17.5 million was received by Kentucky from the Gates Foundation.

=== Affordable Care Act ===
Kentucky implemented Obamacare, expanding Medicaid and launching Kynect.com, in late 2013. "Kentucky is the only Southern state both expanding Medicaid and operating a state-based exchange," Governor Steve Beshear wrote in a New York Times op-ed outlining his case for the implementation of Obamacare in Kentucky. "It's probably the most important decision I will get to make as governor because of the long-term impact it will have," said Beshear.

=== Hemp ===
On April 19, 2013, Kentucky legalized hemp when Governor Steve Beshear refused to veto Senate Bill 50; Beshear had been one of the last obstacles blocking SB50 from becoming law. Under federal law, hemp had been a Schedule 1 narcotic like PCP and heroin (although hemp typically has 0.3 percent THC, compared to the three to 22 percent usually found in marijuana). The Schedule 1 designation was exempted for Kentucky's pilot hemp research projects when the Agricultural Act of 2014 was passed. The state believes that the production of industrial hemp can benefit its economy.

== See also ==
- Timeline of Kentucky history
- Timeline of Lexington, Kentucky
- Timeline of Louisville, Kentucky
- Outline of Kentucky
- History of Louisville, Kentucky
- List of historical societies in Kentucky
- History of the Southern United States
- List of Kentucky women in the civil rights era
- History of African Americans in Kentucky
- History of the French in Louisville
- Ohio River#History
- Kentucke's Frontiers by Craig Thompson Friend
- History of education in Kentucky
