= Jonathan Creek (disambiguation) =

Jonathan Creek is a British TV mystery series, named for the title character.

It can also refer to:

- Jonathan Creek Township, Moultrie County, Illinois
- Jonathan Creek (New Brunswick), a tributary of the Petitcodiac river, New Brunswick
- Jonathan Creek (Ohio), a stream in Ohio
- Jonathan Creek archaeological site, in Aurora, Kentucky
