= John Stewart (frontiersman) =

American frontiersman and explorer

- Born: c. 1740s
- Died: late 1769 or early 1770
- Occupations: Frontiersman, longhunter
- Known for: Early exploration of Kentucky
- Relatives: Daniel Boone (brother-in-law)

John Stewart (also spelled Stuart; c. 1740s – late 1769 or early 1770) was an American frontiersman, longhunter, and early explorer of Kentucky. He is best known as the brother-in-law and member of Daniel Boone's expedition into the Kentucky wilderness. Stewart was among the first American hunters to spend extended time west of the Appalachians, and his disappearance in Kentucky marked one of the early fatalities of settler expansion into Native-held lands.

== Early life ==
Little is known about Stewart's early life, including his exact date and place of birth. He is believed to have been born in the 1740s, possibly in the Yadkin River Valley of North Carolina, where he became associated with the Boone family. Stewart married into the Boone family, becoming Daniel Boone's brother-in-law, and was likely involved in frontier hunting and land exploration prior to the better-documented 1769 expedition to Kentucky.

== Career ==
In May 1769, Stewart joined Daniel Boone and a small group of men on a long hunting and exploratory journey into Kentucky. They entered the region through the Cumberland Gap and established a camp near the Red River. The expedition marked one of the first extended stays by American hunters in what would later become Kentucky.

On December 22, 1769, Stewart and Boone were captured by a party of Shawnee warriors. The Shawnee, who had not participated in the 1768 Treaty of Fort Stanwix, considered the area part of their hunting territory and viewed the longhunters as trespassers. The captors confiscated their equipment and furs, then released them with a warning never to return.

Stewart later rejoined Boone, and the two resumed hunting in Kentucky. However, in early 1770, Stewart disappeared while alone in the wilderness. Boone searched for him without success. His fate remains unknown, although he is presumed to have been killed by Native warriors resisting colonial encroachment.

== See also ==
- Squire Boone
- Samuel Barton
- John Finley (frontiersman)
- History of Kentucky
