= Lynching of Benjamin and Mollie French =

1876 murders in Warsaw, Gallatin County, Kentucky, US

The lynching of the Frenches of Warsaw took place in Warsaw, Gallatin County, Kentucky on May 3, 1876, between 1 am and 2 am on a Wednesday morning. Benjamin and Mollie French, African Americans, were lynched by a white mob for the murder of another African American, which was unusual for this period. Lake Jones was an elderly black man who had faithfully served a white family named Howard, both before and after his emancipation from slavery. The Frenches were accused of poisoning Lake Jones with arsenic and intending to steal his money.

The Ku Klux Klan lynched the Frenches because, they said, Lake Jones was "the best nigger in the country." The KKK broke into the jail, took the Frenches about a mile upstream of Warsaw, and hanged them both from a tree on J.H. McDaniels' (McDonnell's in another account) farm.

== Murder and attempted robbery of Lake Jones ==
Lake Jones lived with his cousin Mollie and her husband Benjamin French in a run-down building called "the Malt-house" in Warsaw. When he moved in with the Frenches, Jones contributed to the household food and paid their rent. After he moved out, the Frenches schemed to get the rest of his money.

On April 19, 1876, Jones went to work on a farm as usual and "returned in the evening as healthy and fresh as ever." Mollie French invited him to have dinner, and he accepted. A half-hour later, Jones began to feel very ill, vomiting up blood and complaining of a burning pain in his stomach and intestines. He threw himself on the floor and rolled about in agony, calling for a physician. The Frenches just watched him. About an hour later, some neighbors came by, and put Jones into his bed. They called Dr. Robinson, the local physician. Robinson immediately suspected arsenic poisoning. After three days of agony, Jones died on April 22, 1876.

Judge-Executive Brown of the County Court ordered an investigation on April 24. It was discovered that Benjamin French had procured one ounce of arsenic at Vance's drug store a few days before, saying he wanted it to kill rats. Upon questioning, both Benjamin and Mollie French admitted that Benjamin bought the poison, but denied they had bought it to murder Jones. Later that evening, Mollie French tried to escape "with Place Reston, a Negro roustabout, with whom she had had improper intercourse for some time."

The after-death examination by Dr. Robinson confirmed his suspicion that Lake had died of arsenic poisoning, and he sent Jones' stomach "to Louisville for chemical examination."

Benjamin and Mollie French were arrested on April 24, 1876, by Judge Brown's order, and charged with murder. It was suggested that Place Reston also be arrested, but Judge Brown refused to do so. He believed that Reston had nothing to do with the murder of Jones.

== The lynch mob break the Frenches out of jail ==
After the Frenches had been held for 10 days in the Warsaw jail, in the early morning of May 3, 1876, John Brown, A. Kirby and Charles Woods, three young men working at the Brown Hotel, "heard the noise of horses trotting about the streets". The three young men peeked out the window and saw a disguised man on horseback in the middle of the square in front of the courthouse. Near the next corner, a party of five or six men were halting. Wednesday was "a brilliant night," as "the moon shone brightly," and "it was nearly as light as day".

The "man on the Court-house (sic) square called out, 'All ready', and the whole party moved up toward the jail building, which is a small one-story brick building in the back of the Courthouse." At 1:10 am, Jailer Joseph Wilshire, "whose grim and grave looks are more threatening then his small and feeble frame", was awakened by knocks on his front and back doors. His house was about 150 yards from the jail. The men cried out, "Get up, Uncle Joe. Take your keys. We bring a prisoner from the country."

The Cincinnati Commercial reported that the crowd of masked men "got the keys from [Jailer Joseph Wilshire's] wife", whereas the Cincinnati Enquirer reported that Joseph Wilshire got the keys himself.

After Jailer Joe Wilshire got his keys and came out the back door, he was met by two masked men who pulled pistols on him and told him to keep quiet. Wilshire shut the door in their faces and tried to escape out the front, but he was seized by six to eight armed masked men, who ordered him, under penalty of death, to go with them to the jail. There six or eight more men were waiting. Wilshire obeyed them and opened the jail door, next opened the inside door to the cell room, and finally, Wilshire opened the door of the cell where Benjamin and Mollie French lay.

They were sound asleep. The leader of the gang woke them up and said: "We will take you from this prison to another one." Ben French answered: "I thought we were going to be tried by a civil Court." Those were the only words exchanged at the jail. Mollie said nothing and did not resist. Two minutes later, the lynching party, except two men who were guarding the jailer, rode away quickly. They had put their prisoners on horses brought for this purpose. Twenty minutes later, the Jailer was told by his guards to go home, and so he did.

After the three young men at the Brown Hotel heard the two guards ride away, they went over to the jail. They found its door open and the prisoners gone.

== The lynching of Benjamin and Mollie French ==
The entire operation of the masked Warsaw lynch mob took 35 minutes to complete their mission. Wilshire said that the lynch mob were white men, but he would not identify any of them.

The Cincinnati Commercial and the Cincinnati Enquirer disagree on the name of the man's farm where the bodies of the Frenches were found. The Cincinnati Commercial reported that it was J. H. McDaniel's farm, and the Cincinnati Enquirer reported that it was Jim McDonnell's farm.

The three young men from the Brown Motel notified Sheriff R.H. Morrow of what they had seen. At daybreak, these four men followed the trails of the lynchers. The horse trails led to the farm of Jim McDonnell, about three-quarters of a mile above Warsaw where, on an isolated tree, they found the bodies of Benjamin and Mollie hanged from two different branches. Benjamin's body nearly touched the ground, while Mollie's was hanging about eighteen inches above the ground. The corpses were already cold and stiff, so it was determined they had died hours before. It was "a ghastly spectacle".

The morning wind was blowing long clothes of Mollie French about, while the body of Benjamin French swung softly on the branches. Both of their eyes "stared wildly from their sockets". "The mouth of the woman was opened to its full capacity, while the man's tongue, covered with blood, hung out of the mouth, like that of a dead dog". Some grass was found on the knees of Benjamin French's pants, which suggests that he had prayed or called for mercy. Only a nickel was found on the body of the man.

Some of the citizens of Warsaw suggested that those responsible for the lynching were Lake Jones' farmer neighbors, who had come over from the district of Glencoe to avenge the murder of their former friend, while others declared that the mob consisted entirely of Negroes.

== The Frenches' "bad reputation" ==
Benjamin French had worked for several years as a "roustabout" on the Benjamin Franklin and General Buell, early river steamboats operating on the Ohio River. In typical fashion, the local newspaper tried to discredit the Frenches after their lynching deaths, saying that "The Frenches were thoroughly disliked in the community... and Ben was a well-known chicken thief."

Mollie French was known as "a sort of black Borgia". The newspaper reported that she was said to have murdered a former husband by the name of Boaz with arsenic poison too. The Frankfort Tri-Weekly Yeoman reported that "a majority, if not all, of the lynchers, are believed to have been Negroes."

"The colored population of Warsaw is in sympathy with Lake Jones' friends, and nobody cares for the Frenches. Even the father of the executed man has nothing to say to defend his son, and he hardly deplores his horrible fate. Undertaker Taeffee could not get a single colored man to help him dig the graves for the Frenches."

Lake Jones was praised by everybody in Warsaw. The Varshavians speak of him as being "the best nigger" in the country. He was formerly owned by a Mr. Howard, whom he served so faithfully that the sons of Mr. Howard offered to bury Jones in their family burial ground, near the old homestead of the Howards. Mr. Howard paid all the expenses of Lake's burial.

The Howard cemetery is on a hill north of Glencoe on Sugar Creek road (US 127). "Turn left onto Johnson Road. There's a new road, with some new homes, that turns off to the left. All of those houses are on what used to be Jacob Howard's farm, later acquired through marriage/inherited by the Crouch's. The family cemetery is in good shape, off to the right of this new road. Lake Jones' final resting place doesn't have a marker."

Nobody was prosecuted or held responsible for the lynchings of the Frenches of Warsaw.

== See also ==
- 1866 Gallatin County race riot
- Lynching of Marie Thompson
- Lynching of the Walker family
