= Lynching of Marie Thompson =

1904 murder in Kentucky, US

The lynching of Marie Thompson of Shepherdsville took place in the early morning on June 15, 1904, in Lebanon Junction, Bullitt County, Kentucky, for her killing of John Irvin, a white landowner. The day before Thompson had attempted to defend her son from being beaten by Irvin in a dispute; he ordered her off the land. As she was walking away from him, he attacked her with a knife and she killed him in self-defense with a razor. She was arrested and put in the county jail.

About a dozen white men went to the jail at midnight the day of the killing to lynch Thompson. They were surprised by a group of armed black people and fled the scene. Assured by the sheriff that he would protect Thompson, the African Americans left. Two hours later, a larger lynch mob of about 50 took Thompson from the jail and prepared to hang her from a nearby tree. She grabbed a knife and freed herself, but did not run far before the group brought her down with a fusillade of mortal shots. She died the following day in jail of her injuries.

== The killing of John Irvin ==
Marie Thompson was a black sharecropper who worked on land owned by John Irvin, a white man. While she and her son were working in her vegetable garden, Irvin approached them, and demanded the return of a pair of pliers. Thompson's son said that he had already returned the tool. Irvin began to accuse the boy of stealing the pliers, verbally berating him, and kicked him several times in the back.

Thompson confronted the landowner over her son, and they argued. Shocked that Thompson challenged him, Irvin demanded that she "get off his place." By evicting Thompson, Irvin took her home, income, and dignity. "Angry and desperate, Thompson... struck back."

According to Thompson, she complied with Irvin's demand, but "intentionally walked slowly". Irvin became enraged and tried to attack Marie from behind with a knife. Thompson, a woman weighing 255 pounds (116 kg), got the better of Irvin and cut his throat with a razor, killing him. Thompson sold her horse and furniture to her neighbors, and was preparing to flee when she was arrested.

== Attempted lynching ==
Thompson was arrested, jailed, and charged with murder. That same day, the Courier-Journal published an article about Irvin's death. That night an armed band of about a dozen white men formed a lynch mob and surrounded the jail in Lebanon Junction at midnight on June 14, 1904, intending to lynch Thompson. One man used a sledgehammer to beat at the large padlock keeping a heavy iron bar in place across the door of the jail. While the mob was trying to break in, a group of armed African-American men came behind them. The black men opened fire on the whites. The white men fled, firing off only a few wild shots in their escape from the scene. The gunfire brought most of the people of the village to the jail.

After the white County Sheriff and his deputies promised to protect Thompson if the mob returned, the group of black people dispersed.

== The lynching ==
Two hours later at 2am, a mob of 50 men appeared at the jail. Meeting no response from law enforcement, they took Marie Thompson from her cell, dragging her by a rope tied around her neck, and tried to hang her from a tree in the jail yard. When Thompson saw that begging for mercy wasn't going to work, she began fighting the mob "like a tiger". One account described her as an "Amazon tiger". Eventually, the 50 white men got the noose around Thompson's neck, threw it over the branch, and pulled Thompson off the ground. Thompson quickly twisted her body around, grabbed hold of one of the lynchers by the collar, snagged his knife, and cut the hemp rope. When she dropped to the ground, she started swinging at the drunken men. Thompson broke away from the crowd and started to run away. She was hit by a hail of gunfire, more than 100 shots. When she finally fell, the mob cheered.

Thompson died the next evening in the Shepherdsville county jail. On her deathbed, she told her doctor: "I didn't want to kill him. I only wanted to pay him back for what he had done to me and my boy." Thompson's defense showed that black families at the turn of the century South were still prepared to protect their own from offenses by whites.

However, there are certain sources that provide evidence of the survival of Mary Dent Thompson. News reports from the period made after those reporting her death indicate that she was in fact tended to at the Shepherdsville jail after the shooting and safely transported to Louisville, KY, where she was allowed to recover. The Lexington Herald published on 8 September 1905, states on page five that Thompson stood trial and was sentenced to two years in the penitentiary. She is said to have gone on to live until her death in 1934.

== Aftermath ==
Having betrayed the promise to protect Marie Thompson, the Sheriff and his deputies, and the whites in Lebanon Junction feared that local black people would seek revenge. Whites in Lebanon Junction armed themselves and waited several nights for an attack that never took place.

== See also ==
- Lynching of the Walker family
- Lynching of Benjamin and Mollie French
- Lynching of women in the United States
