= Tomahittan =

The Tomahittan were Native Americans whom Virginians James Needham and Gabriel Arthur tried to contact to bypass the taxes of the Occaneechi "middlemen" natives.

Other sources record that Tomahitan was the name of the main town of the Nottoway people in Southside Virginia. Some authors have mistaken the Tomahitans for the Cherokee, but in 1727 a delegation of Cherokee visiting Charleston referred to the Tomahitans as old enemies of their allies, the Yamasee.

According to archaeologist Gregory Waselkov, the Tomahittan are "a Hitichiti-speaking group, probably a splinter from Ocute, a polity on the Oconee River, who moved to this vicinity in the late seventeenth century after the fall of Ocute."

Gabriel Arthur claimed that the Tomahittans kept men of the "Weesock" tribe as warrior slaves. Historian John R. Swanton has proposed that the "Weesock" were the Waxhaw.

Using linguistics, Dave Kaufman believes that the Tomahittans are the Siouan speaking Biloxi people, and their name translates to "Big Town".
