= 1866 Gallatin County race riot =

Riot in Gallatin, Kentucky, US

The 1866 Gallatin County Race Riot took place from August 3 past August 13 a year after the close of the American Civil War in Gallatin County, Kentucky. It was part of waves of violence by whites against blacks in the state, and even in northern Kentucky, where the black population was relatively small. According to historians Lowell H. Harrison and James C. Klotter, "A band of five hundred whites in Gallatin County... forced hundreds of blacks to flee across the Ohio River."

== Background ==
This was part of white insurgent violence throughout the state against blacks. In the aftermath of war, most veterans had retained their arms. The Freedmen's Bureau reported "hundreds of outrages" against blacks during this year. The Civil Rights Act of 1866 had been passed by Congress, giving blacks the right to testify against whites in court, but Kentucky courts ignored the law, and white vigilantes went largely unpunished.

In areas with a relatively small black population, like Gallatin County, whites sometimes tried to drive all blacks away. During the 1866 race riot, for example, some 500 whites in Warsaw were "whipping Blacks, stealing their property, and ordering them to leave the area," according to a letter by the local Freedman's Bureau office.

Freedmen's Bureau agent J.J. Landrum reported by letter dated August 3, 1866 to the area office in Covington, Kentucky, "Some 200 negroes I'm informed crossed the Ohio above this place today others are preparing to leave for fear of... other abuses." In a second letter describing the situation in Warsaw 10 days later, J.J Landrum concluded that Union soldiers, or bluecoats", were needed in order to stop the violence. There is no documentation for when that spate of violence ended. Violence against blacks in northern Kentucky continued into the next year, when blacks were attacked and pushed out of Kenton, Boone and Grant counties in August 1867, seeking shelter in Covington.

== See also ==
- Lynching of Benjamin and Mollie French: 10 years later in Gallatin County
