= Jonathan Creek (Ohio) =

Stream in Ohio, U.S.

Coordinates: 39°52′16″N 82°02′44″W

Jonathan Creek is a stream in the U.S. state of Ohio.

Jonathan Creek was named for Jonathan Zane, brother of Ebenezer Zane, a pioneer who became lost and camped out the night there.

== See also ==
- List of rivers of Ohio
