= John Finley (frontiersman) =

American frontiersman and trader

- Born: c. 1724
- Died: c. 1783
- Occupations: Frontiersman, Trader
- Known for: Early exploration of Kentucky; guiding Daniel Boone

John Finley (also spelled Findley; c. 1724 – c. 1783) was an American frontiersman and trader known for his early exploration of what is now Kentucky and for introducing Daniel Boone to the region. Finley is recognized as one of the first recorded Euro-American traders to venture beyond the Appalachian Mountains into the trans-Allegheny frontier.

== Early life and exploration ==
Little is known about Finley's early life, though he likely came from Pennsylvania or Virginia. By the early 1750s, he had become involved in the fur trade and was traveling through Native American territories west of the Appalachian Mountains. In 1752, Finley is believed to have reached Eskippakithiki, a Shawnee village in what is now Clark County, Kentucky, where he traded goods with local tribes. This may represent the first documented European-American trading expedition into central Kentucky.

== Role in Daniel Boone’s expedition ==
Finley's most lasting historical significance stems from his influence on Daniel Boone. The two men reportedly met during their service in the French and Indian War. During this time, Finley told Boone about the fertile lands beyond the Cumberland Gap, recounting his own trading experience in Kentucky. This inspired Boone's later interest in the region.

In 1769, Finley reunited with Boone in North Carolina and helped organize a private expedition into Kentucky. Acting as a guide, Finley led Boone and several others through the Cumberland Gap—an important natural pass through the Appalachian Mountains—marking the start of Boone's long association with the Kentucky frontier.

== Later life and legacy ==
After the 1769 expedition, Finley's life becomes less visible in the historical record. Some sources suggest he continued trading in the western territories, but his activities after the 1770s are largely undocumented. He is believed to have died by 1783.

Although Finley did not achieve the same level of fame as Boone, historians credit him with playing a critical role in opening Kentucky to Anglo-American exploration and settlement. His firsthand knowledge of Native trade routes and geography contributed to Boone's success and the broader movement of colonial settlers westward.

== See also ==
- History of Kentucky
- History of Appalachia
