= Lynching of the Walker family =

1908 murders in Kentucky, US

- Location: Near Hickman, Fulton County, Kentucky, United States
- Date: October 3, 1908
- Attack type: Lynching, mass murder, arson
- Deaths: 7 (or 8)
- Perpetrator: Night Riders
- Motive: Racial violence, economic competition, civil disruption surrounding the Reelfoot Lake disputes

The lynching of the Walker family took place near Hickman, Fulton County, Kentucky, on October 3, 1908, at the hands of about 50 masked Night Riders. David Walker was a landowner, with a 21.5-acre (8.7 ha) farm. The entire family of seven African Americans including parents, an infant in arms, and four children were killed, with the event reported by national newspapers. Governor Augustus E. Willson of Kentucky strongly condemned the murders and promised a reward for information leading to prosecution. No one was ever prosecuted.

These murders took place in a period of civil disruption when white farmers in western Kentucky and Tennessee, organized as Night Riders, threatened and attacked people after the West Tennessee Land Company took private control of the Reelfoot Lake. Local residents had long treated the lake as their own. They were also resisting the expansion into this area of the cotton economy, led by large-scale planters who hired many African Americans as sharecroppers.

After two prominent white attorneys related to the land company were kidnapped and one murdered in Lake County, Tennessee governor Malcolm Rice Patterson directed an investigation and ordered in the state militia to suppress the violence. Six men were convicted and sentenced to death in that case. The state of Tennessee acquired the lake, preserving it for public use as a state park.

== Background ==
In the spring of 1908, white yeoman farmers and fishermen in Fulton County, Kentucky, and Lake and Obion counties in neighboring western Tennessee began to organize as Night Riders in opposition to the West Tennessee Land Company, a group of private investors who had acquired most of Reelfoot Lake and announced plans to drain it for cotton cultivation. The local people had long used the lake for fishing, and farmed the fertile land nearby. They did not want it converted to exclusively private use. For months they hanged, beat and threatened other locals, with violence extending to threats and lynchings of African Americans to drive them out of the area. This was also a period when locals were resisting the expansion of the cotton economy into this area, which had been dominated by yeomen farmers.

By the early 20th century, some African Americans in Fulton County had become landowners. Among them was David Walker, who had a 21 1/2-acre farm a few miles from Hickman, where he and his wife were raising a large family. They had built their log cabin farmhouse.

== The killings ==
After David Walker, a married African-American farmer and family man, had an altercation with a white man, a mob of 50 Night Riders came to his house at night and threatened him, saying he had to go with them. When he refused to come out of his house, the lynch mob poured coal oil on it and set it on fire. Walker pleaded for the safety of him and his family, and then walked outside, where he was shot so many times that his body was riddled with bullets. The same thing happened when David Walker's wife came outside, holding a baby in her arms.

"She held in her arms their infant child and begged the Night Riders for mercy. Disregarding her pleadings the infuriated mob opened fire and a bullet pierced the body of an infant in its mother's arms. A second shot struck the mother in the abdomen and she fell, still holding the dead body of her infant."

Three children came out next, and were quickly shot and killed by the mob. Walker's eldest son, however, refused to leave the burning log cabin. The Courier-Journal reported, "There is hardly a doubt but the oldest son of Walker preferred death by burning rather than to placing himself as the mercy of the mob, and it is probable that his charred body will be found among the debris." Local papers blamed Walker for the events, describing him as "surly" and having been disrespectful to a white woman.

George Wright wrote that a total of seven family members were killed, but E.M. Beck and Stewart E. Tolnay say that it may have been eight. A 2001 Associated Press report suggested that one or a few of the Walker children survived.

== Catalyst for the lynching ==
According to local newspapers, the Fulton County Night Riders claimed that David Walker had sworn "at a white woman", considered a violation of Jim Crow custom. Whites described Walker as having a bad reputation, and said he was a "surly negro". While whites ostensibly used lynchings to regulate the behavior of Black people, including "attitude" and social behavior, economic competition has frequently been identified to be the underlying cause of lynchings. After David Walker was killed, his adjacent neighbor took over Walker's 21 1/2 acres of property. He later sold it to another white man, whose daughter owns the property today. It has not been developed.

== Governor's condemnation ==
Augustus E. Willson denounced the Night Riders for the lynching of the Walker family. He said,

"If two or three men had gone to this poor cabin and murdered this family, the crime would have shocked humanity with its revelation of incredible weakness, brutality and dastardly cowardice. That a larger number—some fifty men—joined in such a crime, multiplies its cowardliness and wickedness fiftyfold, and makes every member of the band guilty of murder in the first degree."

Willson said the lynching of the Walker family was "an outgrowth and the logical results of the toleration of night rider crimes in the state. It is only one step removed from civil war." From 1907 through 1908, other Night Riders had committed increasingly destructive crimes in the Black Patch Tobacco Wars, especially in Kentucky and Tennessee counties to the east of here. They had raided and taken control of the county seats of Princeton, Hopkinsville, and Russellville, Kentucky, destroying tobacco warehouses and tons of stored tobacco of non-PPA farmers, and raided major planters in Crittenden County. As they escaped control of the planters, they made further attacks against African Americans.

Willson offered a $500 reward for the arrest and conviction of any Night Rider who participated in the Walker family lynching. He urged law-abiding citizens to defend themselves, promising a Governor's pardon to anyone who shot and killed a Night Rider.

== Aftermath ==
Seven of the Walker family were brutally murdered. As was typical of lynchings of Black people, no one was prosecuted for this crime.

Violence continued in the region, culminating in the kidnapping of two prominent white attorneys and lynching murder of one, Captain Quentin Rankin, a shareholder in the Land Company. Governor Malcolm Rice Patterson of Tennessee called out the state militia to investigate the murder and suppress the violence. More than 300 suspects were arrested; six were convicted and sentenced to death for Rankin's murder. However, the convictions were later overturned by the Tennessee Supreme Court. One officer in the state militia said the six never committed another crime in the region: "They had experienced a close call with the gallows and had no stomach for further night riding."

Tennessee acquired the lake and land, ultimately establishing it as Reelfoot Lake State Park, so that public use was assured.

== See also ==
- Lynching of Marie Thompson of Shepherdsville
- Lynchings of Benjamin and Mollie French
