= Jonathan Creek archaeological site =

Jonathan Creek archaeological site is an important Mississippian era (ca. A.D. 1000–1500) village and burial mound site, situated on the banks of the Tennessee River, located in the unincorporated town of Aurora in Marshall county, Kentucky. It was originally discovered and noted by Robert Loughridge in the late 19th century. C.B. Moore returned in 1914–1915; however, his work failed to recover many significant artifacts. Further research of the site was initiated by William S. Webb with William D. Funkhouser in the 1930s, with excavations beginning in 1940 by the Civilian Conservation Corps. The project ended only 2 years later when the US entered into WWII. Webb published his findings in 1952. The reports revealed the remnants of 89 structures within a fortified stockade enclosure. The approximate occupation of this area dates from approximately 1200 AD to 1300 AD The original analysis of Dr. Webb was expanded upon by Dr. Sissel Schroeder who continued this work in the 1990s.

== History ==
The Jonathan Creek site was originally owned by the Henson family. They were first approached in the late 1800s by Robert Loughridge, a surveyor, who drafted a report on the geology of Western Kentucky. In this report, he identified Jonathan Creek as having six earthen mounds similar to others that had been come to be known as the work of ancient Native Americans, which were situated on a terrace overlooking the Tennessee River. There was also a seventh mound in the floodplain on the creek.

The site was next mentioned by C.B. Moore who traveled the waters of the SouthEast in his riverboat the Gopher of Philadelphia. He made his way to the Jonathan Creek site between approximately 1914–1915. Although he ran tests, they failed to come up with significant artifacts and the site was abandoned in favor of others with more potential.

As a part of FDR's "New Deal" the Tennessee Valley Authority, a federally funded relief agency, was established by Congress in 1933 to address a wide array of environmental, economic, and technological issues. This included expansion to bring low-cost electricity to the masses in the Tennessee Valley Authority was created to head the management of natural resources in this area. The TVA's plans to create dams along the Tennessee River put this, and other archaeological sites, in jeopardy. After petitioning the TVA, archaeologists were able to begin a salvage archaeology project with the help of the Civilian Conservation Corps (CCC), which provided inexpensive, albeit untrained, labor for the project. The generally mild climate made it possible to excavate year round, which would not have been possible in other regions. At the beginning of the US involvement in WWII, work abruptly ended, but not before they had uncovered 89 house structures and 8 stockade lines that encircled the site with bastions.

The preliminary data on the Jonathan Creek site was first published by William Webb. The report showed that the artifact analyses are based on a very small fraction of the more than 100 cubic feet of cultural materials recovered. Only 150 stone artifacts and 2,685 ceramic rims, sherds, and other items were tabulated in the report. This brief publication remained the definitive work on the site until Dr. Sissel Schroeder initiated her work in the 1990s. Her use of Geographic Information System (GIS) technology mapped more than 1000 of Webb's measurements, documented site features and was able to correlate his findings and provide a better interpretation of the site and its former uses.

== Findings and conclusions ==
This Mississippian-era town and mound center site shows a history of growth and rebuilding. Many of the structures were destroyed and rebuilt, some in a slightly different orientation, as evidenced by the photos showing post-hole locations and overlapping wall borders and trenches. A total of seven flat-topped earthen mounds were uncovered, of which six were located on the terrace overlooking Jonathan Creek and the seventh was located on the floodplain of the creek itself.

Of the 89 uncovered structures, there were many different types of architectural styles and construction. There were single-post circular, square and rectangular houses, which may have been used during summer months; and rectangular pit houses; square and rectangular wall trench structures of which some had three refport posts running the length of the structure, which could possibly have been used during the winter. There were at least eight walls that surrounded the complex. A ninth wall ran through part of the village, which indicated that the perimeter might have changed over time. This indicates tactical flexibility and strategic planning. Jonathan Creek is one of the better known southeastern fortification sites.

Webb wrote that the village was likely two separate occupations based on the differences in the architecture of the buildings and bastions. Along with other evidence, the different bastion lengths indicates that the structures were actually rebuilt, further strengthening his original theory. Dr. Schroeder was able to create comprehensive maps of the site combining both Dr. Webb's meticulously detailed field notes and her GIS studies. All the recorded features listed are on the maps; however, she disagreed with some of the original findings and inferred other possibilities using the data. Her research at Jonathan Creek illustrates that such a shift probably did not occur, contradicting Webb's early interpretation, and the explanation for the construction of one type as opposed to the other must be sought elsewhere, possibly in site specific event. Schroeder wrote that the outermost wall with both long and short bastions was likely the final stockade because it was the wall that did not appear to have been rebuilt over time.

The evidence and data collected at the Jonathan Creek site suggest that this Mississippian-era settlement occupied during the 1200s AD, was built in response to area politics and possible social upheaval. The walled fort and structures indicate that the inhabitants were concerned about their security and well-being. By controlling access to the village, the people created a self-contained environment with relative security and protection.

On top of the mound, a wall trench structure was built on the summit, which was later rebuilt presumably for a different purpose. The second structure was destroyed by a fire at a later date. A third structure was built on this site, which was also destroyed by fire. Twelve burials were located what would have been just outside the built and re-built structures. It is unknown as to whether the buildings were burned intentionally as a part of a ritual or as a result of a battle with an outside group; however, after the last fire it was no longer used. A burial was also located in shallow grave in one of the small mounds at the edge of the village. The association of human interments with mounds is seen as one of the distinguishing characteristics of Mississippian chiefdoms.

The artifacts located by the CCC have been stored and displayed at the University of Kentucky Museum of Anthropology. The museum was renamed the William S. Webb Museum of Anthropology in 1995 given his many contributions to the field.
