= Mill Creek chert =

Type of chert

Coordinates: 37°20′37.75″N 89°16′12.36″W

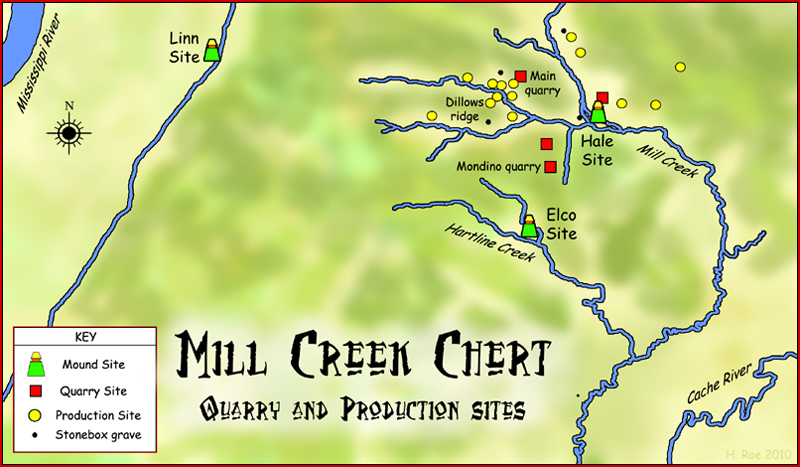
Map showing geographical extent of Mississippian stone statues

Mill Creek chert is a type of chert found in Southern Illinois and heavily exploited by members of the Mississippian culture (800 to 1600 CE). Artifacts made from this material are found in archaeological sites throughout the American Midwest and Southeast. It is named for a village and stream near the quarries, Mill Creek, Illinois and Mill Creek, a tributary of the Cache River. The chert was used extensively for the production of utilitarian tools such as hoes and spades, and for polished ceremonial objects such as bifaces, spatulate celts and maces.

== History ==
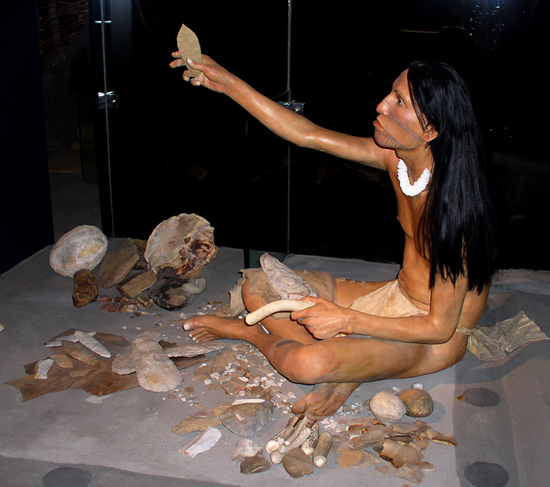
Diorama at Cahokia of flintknapper at work on hoes and bifaces

Chert is a siliceous (silica) stone, a variety of quartz similar to flint but more brittle. It naturally occurs as large, flat, elliptically shaped nodules in creek beds, and sometimes as hill-top residuum. The nodules were formed as part of the Ullin limestone formation during the Mississippian geologic period (roughly 359 to 318 million years ago). Mill Creek Chert is a tough, coarse-grained chert, usually brown or gray in color, and occurs as large tabular shaped nodules.

The best archaeological evidence states that maize (corn) first entered the United States from Mexico around 800 CE. It quickly spread throughout the continent and created a full scale lifestyle shift for the prehistoric people of the area. The cultivation and harvest of maize would allow for the creation of permanent villages and cities. To cultivate maize, tools were needed to till, plant and harvest the new crops. The spade was invented to accomplish these agricultural goals. Spades were chipped from large pieces of tabular flint from sources like Mill Creek, Dover, and Kaolin chert. Although no prehistoric hafting exist today, it is likely that the spades were hafted at right angles to the handle and used much like today's garden hoes. The technological leap created by mastering the spade production and the cultivation of maize was one of the single most important events over man's 14,000 year prehistory in America.

At the turn of the 20th century, archaeologists began realizing that in the hilly lands of Southern Illinois was the location for the quarrying and production centers—one of the greatest in prehistoric North America for this type of stone. The sites were located near Mill Creek, Illinois, a village in Union County, located between Jonesboro and Cairo on the Alexander County line. From this collection of sites, known colloquially as the "Indian Diggings", Native Americans quarried, worked into tools and blanks, and exported this stone to the wider Mississippian world. The chert found here was one of the major exported raw materials of the Mississippian culture and its distribution and procurement was one of the largest mining and production efforts organized during the Mississippian period. The raw material was dug up in the quarries and then transported to small hamlets for production in hoes, spades and blanks. Archaeologists believe they were then transported to and traded at regional mound centers such as the Hale Site, a palisaded village with a platform mound and a burial mound. From these local sites, they were then transported and traded at sites even further afield. These materials were some of the most widely exchanged items during this period, with especially large amounts transported to the American Bottom region. Examples are numerous at Cahokia, where it was especially prized for hoes and spades, but finds have been made in locations as distant as Spiro and Moundville.

== Types of use ==
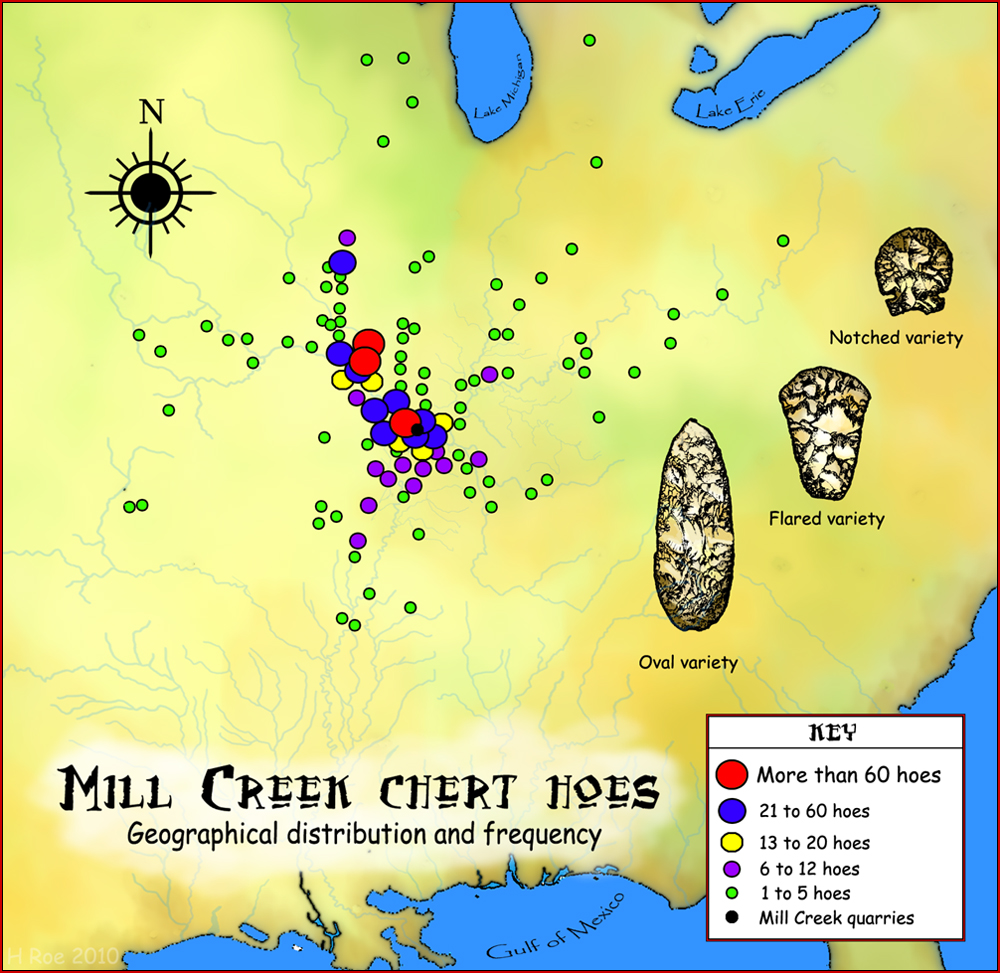
A map showing the geographical distribution and frequency of Mill Creek chert finds

The most common tools made from Mill Creek chert were digging implements. The physical properties of the stone and its ability to absorb repeated use without breaking as often as other stone, made it especially suitable for these types of tools. The Mississippian culture's heavy dependence on maize agriculture and their monumental architecture (platform mounds, moats and embankments) made such tools especially valuable. Three main varieties of Mississippian culture hoes have been found, differentiated by their shape, oval, flared and notched. The oval and flared varieties were hafted to L-shaped wooden handles, such as the one wielded by the Birger figurine. The notched version was probably hafted as a spade. Another advantageous property of the Mill Creek chert was the large size of the nodules, which meant that the corresponding tools could be large. Some hoes were up to 60 centimetres (24 in) in length.

The other main use for the chert was large ceremonial bifaces, spatulate celts and stone maces. These were ritual objects, which often display a high degree of craftmanship. Unlike the hoes and other utilitarian tools, the ritual objects were often ground and polished to a high degree of finish. Many Southeastern Ceremonial Complex artworks depict figures wielding these ceremonial items, especially the sword shaped ceremonial bifaces and maces. As with the hoes, these artifacts could also be quite large, with some of the swordlike bifaces being up to 50 centimetres (20 in) in length. These ritual objects have been found throughout the American Bottom, the Lilbourn Site in New Madrid County, Missouri and as far away as Spiro and Gahagan Mounds, Caddoan Mississippian culture sites in Oklahoma and Louisiana. Although the objects are modeled after actual weapons, such as war clubs, archaeologists believe they were too delicate to function as actual weapons and instead functioned as status symbols.

== Gallery of Mill Creek chert artifacts ==
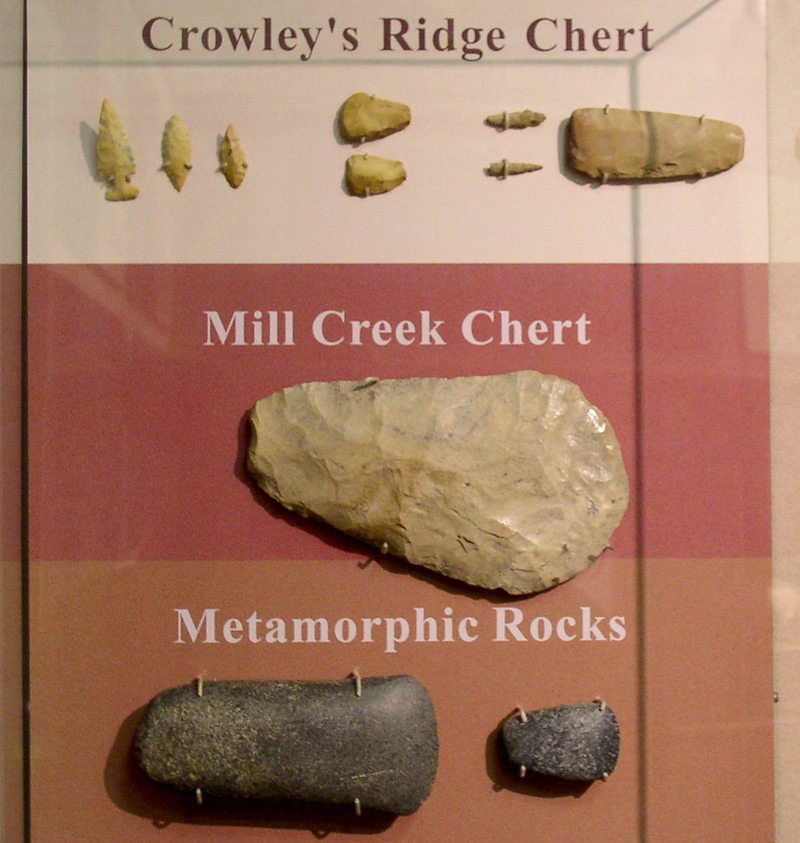
Hoe from the Parkin site

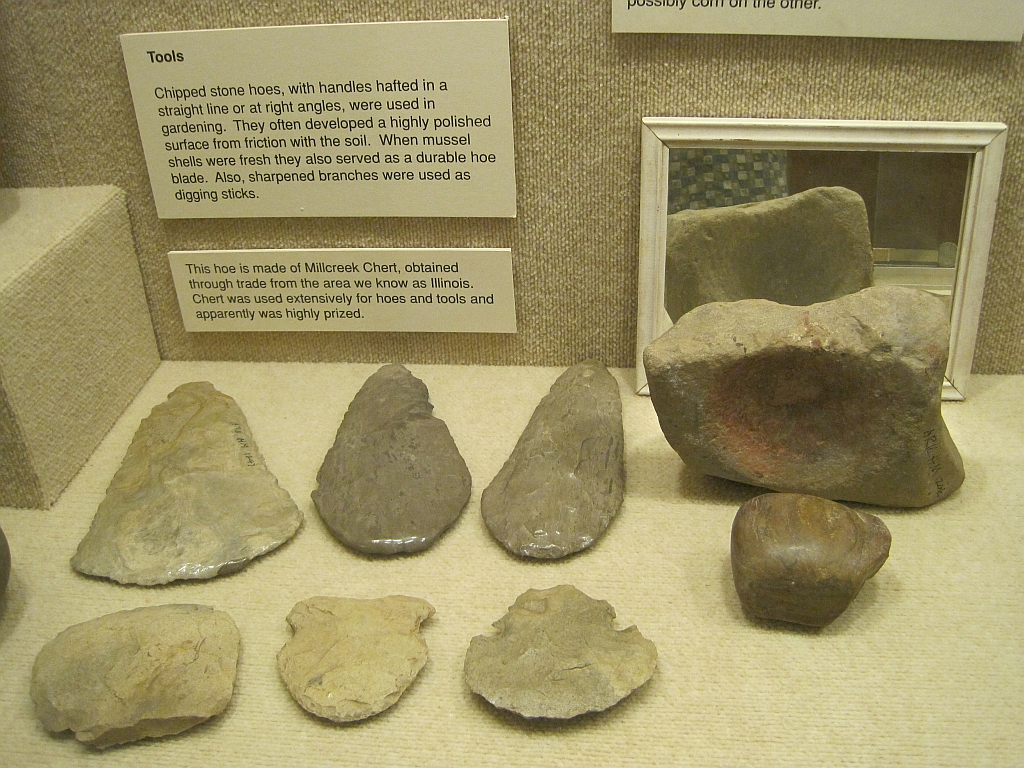
Hoes from the Nodena site

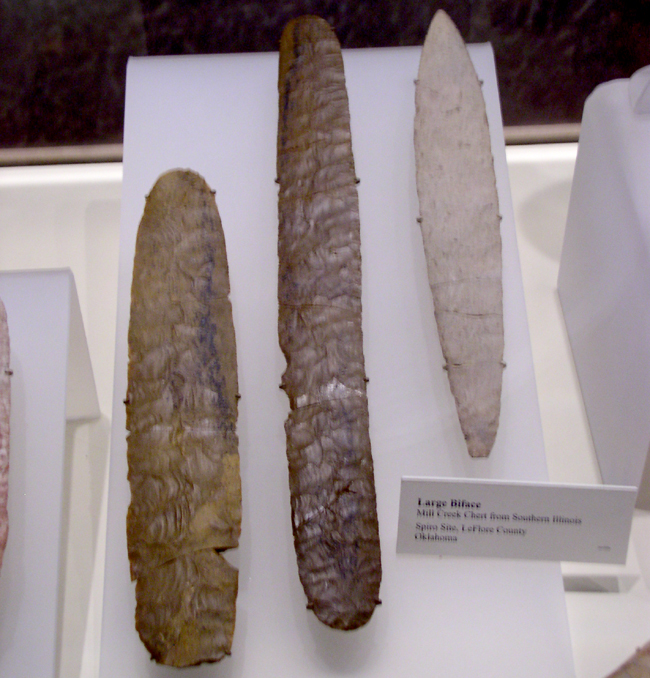
Ceremonial swordlike bifaces from the Spiro Mounds site

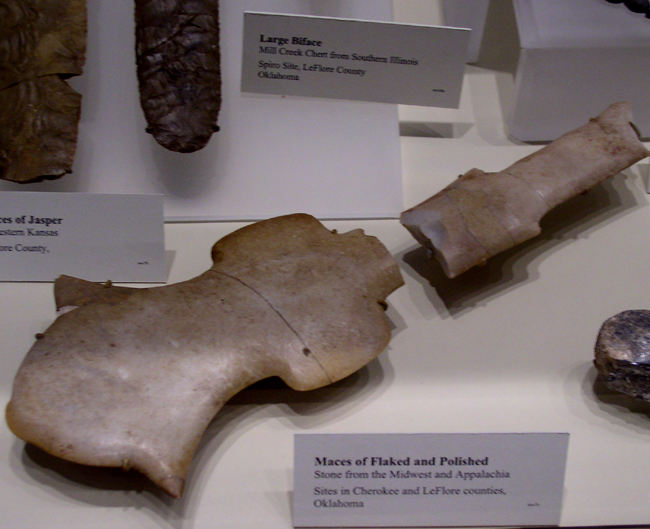
Mississippian culture stone mace from Spiro

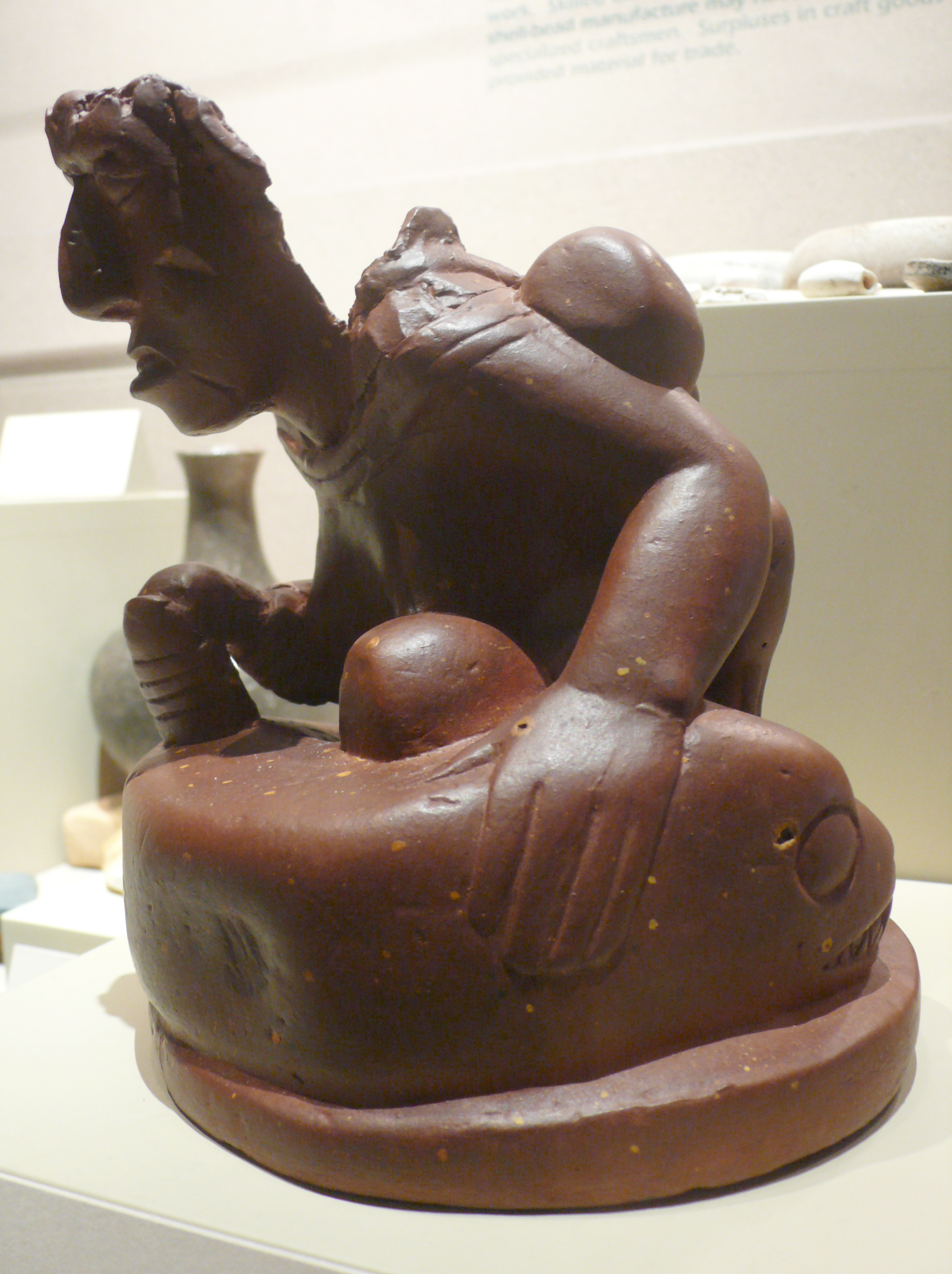
Stone figurine wielding a hoe hafted to an L-shaped handle

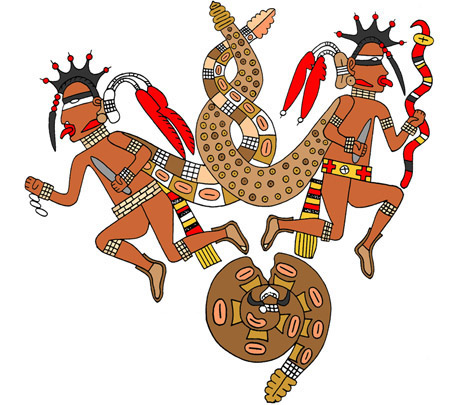
SECC design from an engraved shell found at Spiro

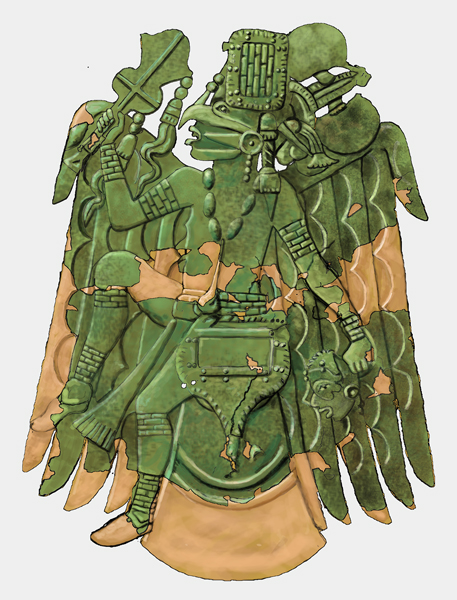
Rogan plate found at Etowah

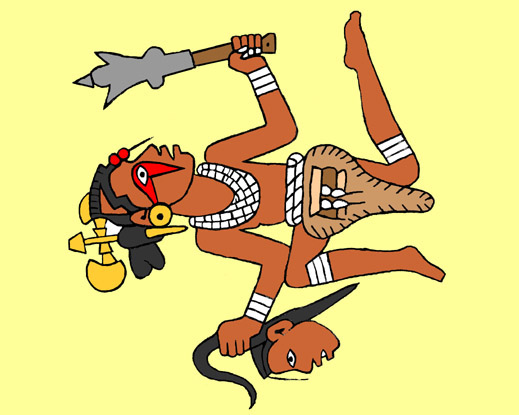
SECC design from an engraved shell found at Castalian Springs

== See also ==
- Duck River cache
- Visual arts by indigenous peoples of the Americas
- List of Mississippian sites
