= Theocracy =

Form of government with religious leaders

Theocracy is a form of government in which one or more deities are recognized as supreme ruling authorities giving divine guidance to human intermediaries with executive, legislative or judicial power who manage the government's daily affairs.

== Etymology ==
The word theocracy originates from the Ancient Greek theocratia (θεοκρατία), meaning "the rule of God". This, in turn, derives from θεός (theos), meaning "god", and κρατέω (krateo), meaning "to rule". Thus the meaning of the word in Greek was "rule by god(s)" or human incarnation(s) of god(s).

The term was initially coined by Flavius Josephus in the first century AD to describe the characteristic government of the Jews. Josephus argued that while mankind had developed many forms of rule, most could be subsumed under the following three types: monarchy, oligarchy, and democracy. However, according to Josephus, the government of the Jews was unique. Josephus offered the term theocracy to describe this polity in which a god was sovereign and the god's word was law.

Josephus' definition was widely accepted until the Enlightenment era, when the term took on negative connotations and was barely salvaged by Hegel's commentary. The first recorded English use was in 1622, with the meaning "sacerdotal government under divine inspiration" (as in ancient Israel and Judah); the meaning "priestly or religious body wielding political and civil power" was first recorded in 1825.

== Definition ==
The term theocracy derives from the Koine Greek θεοκρατία ('rule of God') a term used by Josephus for the kingdoms of Israel and Judah, reflecting the view that "God himself is recognized as the head" of the state. The common, generic use of the term, as defined above in terms of rule by a church or analogous religious leadership, may be more accurately described as an ecclesiocracy.

In an hierocracy, a specific type of theocracy, the governing body is composed of a hierarchical structure of religious officials or clergy. In an ecclesiocracy, the religious leaders assume a leading role in the state, but do not claim that they are instruments of divine revelation. In a church-state, religious and political power are intertwined, often with the church having significant influence over the government.

A related phenomenon is a secular government co-existing with a state religion or delegating some aspects of civil law to religious communities. For example, in post-Ottoman territories such as Syria, Jordan, Lebanon, Israel (which is sometimes referred to as a theocracy), the Palestinian Authority and Egypt, due to legacy of the millet system marriage is governed by officially recognized religious bodies who each provide marriage services for their respected adherents, yet no form of civil marriage (free of religion) exists, nor marriage by non-recognized minority religions.

According to Merriam-Webster's Dictionary, there are two meanings for the word theocracy: (1) government of a state by immediate divine guidance or by officials who are regarded as divinely guided; and (2) a state governed by a theocracy.

== Current theocracies ==
=== Christian theocracies ===
==== Holy See ====
Following the Capture of Rome on 20 September 1870, the Papal States, including Rome and the Vatican, were annexed by the Kingdom of Italy. In 1929, through the Lateran Treaty signed with the Italian government, the new state of Vatican City was formally created and recognised as an independent state from Fascist Italy. The head of state of the Vatican is the pope, who is elected by the College of Cardinals, an assembly of high-ranking Catholic clergy. The pope is elected for life and either dies in office or, in extremely rare situations, may resign. Cardinals themselves are appointed by popes, who thereby choose the electors of their successors. The pope also appoints the Bishop of Urgell, who rules the European microstate of Andorra as a constitutional co-prince alongside the President of France.

Since 1970, voting has been limited to cardinals under 80. The Secretary for Relations with States, directly responsible for international relations, is appointed by the pope. The Vatican legal system is rooted in canon law. The Bishop of Rome, as Supreme Pontiff, "has the fullness of legislative, executive and judicial powers." Although the laws of Vatican City derive from the secular law of Italy, under article 3 of the Law of the Sources of the Law, a provision is made for the application of the "laws promulgated by the Kingdom of Italy".

==== Mount Athos ====
Mount Athos is a mountain peninsula in Greece that is an Eastern Orthodox autonomous area consisting of 20 monasteries under the direct jurisdiction of the Primate of Constantinople. Mount Athos has had a continuous Christian presence for almost 1,800 years, with a long history of monasteries dating back to 800 AD, if not earlier. The origin of self-rule at Mount Athos can be traced back to a royal edict issued by the Byzantine emperor John Tzimisces in 972, which was reaffirmed by Emperor Alexios I Komnenos in 1095. Greece wrestled control of the area from the Ottoman Empire during the First Balkan War in 1912. However, it was formally recognized as part of Greece only after a diplomatic dispute with the Russian Empire was no longer an obstacle, after the latter's collapse during World War I.

Mount Athos is specifically exempt from the free movement of people and goods required by Greece's membership in the European Union, and entrance is allowed only with express permission from the monks governing the island. The number of daily visitors to Mount Athos is restricted, with all visitors required to obtain an entrance permit. Only men are permitted to visit, and Eastern Orthodox Christians take precedence in the issuing of permits. Residents of Mount Athos must be men aged 18 and over, members of the Eastern Orthodox Church, and either monks or workers.

Athos is governed jointly by a community consisting of members of the 20 monasteries and a Civil Administrator, appointed by the Greek Ministry of Foreign Affairs. The monastic community is led by the Protos.

==== United Kingdom & the Isle of Man ====
The United Kingdom maintains a measure of partial ecclesiocracy via the Lords Spiritual: 26 senior bishops of the Church of England who sit ex officio in the House of Lords, the upper house of the Parliament of the United Kingdom. Similarly, on the Isle of Man, a crown dependency, the Bishop of Sodor and Man sits ex officio in the Legislative Council of the Isle of Man, the upper house of the Manx Tynwald. Legislation to remove the bishop's seat was passed in 2026, and the Isle will have no bishops in its legislature once the current bishop retires.

=== Islamic theocracies ===
An Islamic republic is a term used for several states officially ruled by Islamic laws, including the Islamic Republics of Iran, Pakistan, and Mauritania. Pakistan first adopted the title in its 1956 constitution. Mauritania adopted it on 28 November 1958. Iran adopted it after the 1979 Iranian Revolution that overthrew the Pahlavi dynasty.

The term "Islamic republic" has come to mean several different things, sometimes contradictorily. To some Muslim religious leaders in the Middle East and Africa who advocate for it, an Islamic republic is a sovereign state under a particular Islamic form of government. They see it as a compromise between a purely Islamic caliphate and secular nationalism and republicanism. In their conception of the Islamic republic, the penal code of the state is required to be compatible with some or all laws of Sharia, and the state does not necessarily have to be a monarchy, as many Middle Eastern states presently are.

==== Afghanistan ====
Afghanistan was an Islamic theocracy when the Taliban first ruled it from 1996 to 2001, and again since their reinstatement of the Islamic Emirate of Afghanistan in 2021.

Spreading from Kandahar, the Taliban eventually captured Kabul in 1996. By the end of 2000, the Taliban controlled 90% of the country, aside from the opposition (Northern Alliance) strongholds, which were primarily found in the northeast corner of Badakhshan Province. Areas under the Taliban's direct control were mainly Afghanistan's major cities and highways. Tribal khans and warlords had de facto direct control over various small towns, villages, and rural areas. The Taliban sought to establish law and order and to impose a strict interpretation of Islamic Sharia, along with the religious edicts of Mullah Mohammed Omar, upon the entire country of Afghanistan.

During the five-year history of the Islamic Emirate, the Taliban regime interpreted the Sharia in accordance with the Hanafi school of Islamic jurisprudence and the religious edicts of Mullah Omar. The Taliban forbade consumption of pork and alcohol, many types of consumer technology such as music, television, and film, as well as most forms of art, such as paintings or photography, male and female participation in sport, including football and chess. Recreational activities such as kite-flying and keeping pigeons or other pets were also forbidden, and the birds were killed according to the Taliban's ruling. Movie theaters were closed and repurposed as mosques. Celebration of the Western and Iranian New Years were forbidden. Taking photographs and displaying pictures or portraits was forbidden, as it was considered by the Taliban as a form of idolatry. Women were banned from working, girls were forbidden to attend schools or universities, were requested to observe purdah, and to be accompanied outside their households by male relatives; those who violated these restrictions were punished. Men were forbidden to shave their beards and required to let them grow and keep them long according to the Taliban's liking, and to wear turbans outside their households. Communists were systematically executed. Prayer was made compulsory and those who did not respect the religious obligation after the azaan were arrested. Gambling was banned. Thieves were punished by amputating their hands or feet. In 2000, the Taliban leader Mullah Omar officially banned opium cultivation and drug trafficking in Afghanistan; the Taliban succeeded in nearly eradicating opium production (99%) by 2001. Under the Taliban governance of Afghanistan, both drug users and dealers were severely prosecuted.

Cabinet ministers and deputies were mullahs with a "madrasah education." Several of them, such as the Minister of Health and Governor of the State Bank, were primarily military commanders ready to leave their administrative posts to fight when needed. Military reversals that trapped them behind lines or led to their deaths increased the chaos in the national administration. At the national level, "all senior Tajik, Uzbek and Hazara bureaucrats" were replaced "with Pashtuns, whether qualified or not." Consequently, the ministries "by and large ceased to function."

Journalist Ahmed Rashid described the Taliban government as "a secret society run by Kandaharis ... mysterious, secretive, and dictatorial." They did not hold elections, as their spokesman explained:

The Sharia does not allow politics or political parties. That is why we give no salaries to officials or soldiers, just food, clothes, shoes, and weapons. We want to live a life like the Prophet lived 1400 years ago, and jihad is our right. We want to recreate the time of the Prophet, and we are only carrying out what the Afghan people have wanted for the past 14 years.

They modeled their decision-making process on the Pashtun tribal council (jirga), together with what they believed to be the early Islamic model. Discussion was followed by the building of a consensus by the "believers". Before capturing Kabul, there was talk of stepping aside once a government of "good Muslims" took power, and law and order were restored.

As the Taliban's power grew, decisions were made by Mullah Omar without consulting the jirga and without consulting other parts of the country. One such instance is the rejection of a jirga decision about the expulsion of Osama bin Laden. Mullah Omar visited the capital, Kabul, only twice while in power. Instead of an election, their leader's legitimacy came from an oath of allegiance (bay'ah), imitating the Islamic prophet Muhammad and the first four caliphs of Islam. On 4 April 1996, Mullah Omar had "the Cloak of Muhammad" taken from its shrine, Kirka Sharif, for the first time in 60 years. Wrapping himself in the relic, he appeared on the roof of a building in the center of Kandahar while hundreds of Pashtun mullahs below shouted "Amir al-Mu'minin!" ('Commander of the Faithful') in a pledge of support. Taliban spokesman Wakil Ahmed Muttawakil explained:

Decisions are based on the advice of the Amir-ul Momineen. For us, consultation is not necessary. We believe that this is in line with the Sharia. We abide by the Amir's view even if he alone takes this view. There will not be a head of state. Instead, there will be an Amir al-Mu'minin. Mullah Omar will be the highest authority, and the government will not be able to implement any decision to which he does not agree. General elections are incompatible with Sharia and therefore we reject them.

The Taliban were reluctant to share power, and since their ranks were overwhelmingly Pashtun, they ruled as overlords over the 60% of Afghans from other ethnic groups. In local government, such as the Kabul city council and in Herat, Taliban loyalists—not locals—dominated, even when the Pashto-speaking Taliban could not communicate with roughly half of the population who spoke Dari or other non-Pashtun tongues. Critics complained that this "lack of local representation in urban administration made the Taliban appear as an occupying force." After the collapse of the government following the fall of Kabul in August 2021, the Taliban returned to power and reestablished an authoritarian theocracy. They declared the restoration of the Second Islamic Emirate of Afghanistan, with their governance rooted in their strict interpretation of Sharia law.

==== Iran ====
Supreme Leader Ali Khamenei propaganda poster

Iran has been described as a theocratic republic by various sources, including the CIA World Factbook. The Constitution of Iran has been described as a "hybrid" of "theocratic and democratic elements" by Francis Fukuyama. Like other Islamic states, it maintains religious laws and has religious courts to interpret all aspects of law. According to Iran's constitution, "all civil, penal, financial, economic, administrative, cultural, military, political, and other laws and regulations must be based on Islamic criteria."

In addition, Iran has a religious ruler and many religious officials in powerful governmental positions. The head of state, the Supreme Leader of Iran, is a faqih (scholar of Islamic law) and has more power than the president of Iran. Iran's current Supreme Leader is Mojtaba Khamenei, a role he has held since 2026. The Leader appoints the heads of many powerful governmental positions: the commanders of the armed forces, the director of the national radio and television network, the heads of powerful major religious and economic foundations, the chief justice of Iran, the attorney general (indirectly through the chief justice), special tribunals, and members of the supreme national security council who govern defense and foreign affairs. He also co-appoints the 12 jurists of the Guardian Council.

The Leader is elected by the Assembly of Experts, which is composed of mujtahids, Islamic scholars competent in interpreting Sharia. The Guardian Council has the power to reject bills passed by the Parliament. It can also approve or reject candidates who want to run for the Presidency, Parliament, and the Assembly of Experts. The council supervises elections and can allow or ban investigations into elections. Six of the twelve council members are faqih and have the power to approve or reject all bills passed by the Parliament, whether the faqih believes that the bill is in accordance with Islamic laws and customs (Sharia) or not. The other six members are lawyers appointed by the chief justice, and a cleric appointed by the Leader.

==== Saudi Arabia ====
In the Basic Law of Saudi Arabia, Saudi Arabia defines itself as a sovereign Arab Islamic state with Islam as its official religion. However, some critiques describe Saudi Arabia as an Islamic theocracy. Religious minorities do not have the right to practice their religions openly. Conversion from Islam to another religion is punishable by death as apostasy. Muhammad Al-Atawneh describes the current Saudi regime as a "theo-monarchy that draws power from long-standing religio-cultural norms."

==== Yemen (Houthi-controlled territories) ====
Yemen has operated as a divided state since the Houthi movement (officially, Ansar Allah) seized the Yemeni capital, Sanaa, in 2014, expelling its internationally recognized government. The Houthis follow Zaydism, a branch of Shia Islam distinct from Iran's Twelver Shi'ism. Their religio-political ideology draws on the Zaydi doctrine of the imamate, which holds that governance must be theocratic and led by a descendant of Muhammad. The movement has increasingly adopted Iranian-style revolutionary politics, including compulsory observance of Shia holidays and revisions to the school curriculum. The territory under Houthi control is a theocratic police state characterized by repression, militarization, and religious indoctrination.

==== Mauritania ====
Mauritania's constitution defines the country as an Islamic republic, designates Islam as the sole religion of its citizenry and the state, and bases its legal system on a combination of French civil law and Sharia. It classifies apostasy as a capital offense: convicted apostates are given three days to repent, after which they face execution, dissolution of family rights, and property confiscation. Blasphemy carries the same penalty. Non-Muslims are barred from citizenship, and conversion from Islam results in automatic loss of citizenship. The death penalty for religious crimes has not been carried out in practice, though prosecutions have occurred. Mauritania holds elections and maintains a nominally civilian government, distinguishing it from clerical theocracies such as Iran; its theocratic character derives from constitutional and legal structure rather than direct clerical rule.

==== Notes ====
Countries like Pakistan, Libya, and parts of Somalia have Sharia as a constitutional source of law but retain secular governing structures alongside it. They are generally classified as Islamic republics rather than theocracies.

=== Central Tibetan Administration ===
The Central Tibetan Administration, colloquially known as the Tibetan government-in-exile, is a Tibetan exile organization with a state-like internal structure. According to its charter, the head of state of the Central Tibetan Administration holds the position ex officio as the Dalai Lama, a religious hierarch. In this respect, it continues the traditions of the former government of Tibet, which was ruled by the Dalai Lamas and their ministers, with a specific role reserved for a class of monk officials.

On 14 March 2011, at the 14th Dalai Lama's suggestion, the parliament of the Central Tibetan Administration began considering a proposal to remove the Dalai Lama's role as head of state in favor of an elected leader.

The first directly elected Kalön Tripa was Samdhong Rinpoche, who was elected on 20 August 2001. Before 2011, the Kalön Tripa position was subordinate to the 14th Dalai Lama, who presided over the government-in-exile from its founding. In August of that year, Lobsang Sangay received 55% of 49,189 votes, defeating his nearest rival, Tethong Tenzin Namgyal, by 8,646 votes, becoming the second popularly elected Kalön Tripa. The Dalai Lama announced that his political authority would be transferred to Sangay.

==== Change to Sikyong ====
On 20 September 2012, the 15th Tibetan Parliament-in-Exile unanimously voted to change the title of Kalön Tripa to Sikyong in Article 19 of the Charter of the Tibetans in exile and relevant articles. The Dalai Lama had previously referred to the Kalön Tripa as Sikyong, and this usage was cited as the primary justification for the name change. According to Tibetan Review, "Sikyong" translates to "political leader", as distinct from "spiritual leader". Foreign affairs Kalön Dicki Chhoyang stated that the term "Sikyong" has had a precedent dating back to the 7th Dalai Lama, and that the name change "ensures historical continuity and legitimacy of the traditional leadership from the Fifth Dalai Lama". The online Dharma Dictionary translates sikyong (srid skyong) as "secular ruler; regime, regent". The title sikyong had previously been used by regents who ruled Tibet during the Dalai Lama's minority.

=== States with official state religions ===
Having a state religion is not sufficient to mean that a state is a theocracy in the narrow sense of the term. Many countries have a state religion without the government directly deriving its powers from a divine or religious authority that directly exercises governmental power. Since few theocracies exist in the modern world, the word "theocracy" is now used descriptively for a government that enforces a state religion.

== Historical theocracies ==
=== Byzantine Empire ===
The Byzantine Empire (a.d. 324–1453) operated under Symphonia, meaning that the emperor was both the head of civil society and the ultimate authority over the ecclesiastical authorities, the patriarchates. The emperor, regarded as God's representative on earth, ruled as an absolute autocrat.

Jennifer Fretland VanVoorst argues that "the Byzantine Empire became a theocracy in the sense that Christian values and ideals were the foundation of the empire's political ideals and heavily entwined with its political goals". Steven Runciman writes in his book The Byzantine Theocracy (2004):

The constitution of the Byzantine Empire was based on the conviction that it was the earthly copy of the Kingdom of Heaven. Just as God ruled in Heaven, so the Emperor, made in His image, should rule on earth and carry out his commandments. ...It saw itself as a universal empire. Ideally, it should embrace all the peoples of the Earth who, ideally, should all be members of the one true Christian Church, its own Orthodox Church. Just as man was made in God's image, so man's kingdom on Earth was made in the image of the Kingdom of Heaven.

=== Caliphates ===
The Sunni Islam stipulates that, as a head of state, a Caliph should be selected or elected by Muslims or by their representatives. Followers of Shia Islam, however, believe a Caliph should be an Imam chosen by God from the Ahl al-Bayt (the "Family of the House", Muhammad's direct descendants). In both cases, caliphs theoretically combine religious and secular powers.

=== China ===
Similar to the Roman Emperor, the Chinese sovereign was historically held to be the Son of Heaven. However, from the first historical Emperor on, this was largely ceremonial and tradition quickly established it as a posthumous dignity, like the Roman institution. The situation before Qin Shi Huang Di (r. 221–210 BCE) is less clear.

The Shang dynasty (c. 1600 BCE to c. 1045 BCE) essentially functioned as a theocracy, declaring the ruling family the sons of heaven and calling the chief sky god Shangdi after a word for their deceased ancestors. After their overthrow by the Zhou, the royal clan of Shang were not eliminated but instead moved to a ceremonial capital where they were charged to continue the performance of their rituals.

The titles combined by Shi Huangdi to form his new title of emperor were originally applied to god-like beings who ordered the heavens and earth and to culture heroes credited with the invention of agriculture, clothing, music, astrology, etc. Even after the fall of Qin in 206 BCE, an emperor's words were considered sacred edicts (聖旨) and his written proclamations "directives from above" (上諭).

As a result, some Sinologists translate the title huangdi (usually rendered "emperor") as thearch. The term properly refers to the head of a thearchy (a kingdom of gods), but the more specific "theocrat" carries associations of a strong priesthood that would be generally inaccurate in describing imperial China. Others reserve the use of the word "thearch" to describe the legendary figures of Chinese prehistory while continuing to use "emperor" to describe historical rulers.

The Heavenly Kingdom of Great Peace (1851 to 1864) in Qing China was a heterodox Christian theocracy led by Hong Xiuquan, who portrayed himself as the younger brother of Jesus Christ. His theocratic state fought one of the most destructive wars in history, the Taiping Rebellion, against the Qing dynasty for fifteen years before being crushed following the 1864 fall of the rebel capital Nanjing.

=== Deseret ===
The question of theocracy has been debated extensively by historians regarding the Latter-Day Saint communities in Illinois and (especially) in Utah.

Joseph Smith, mayor of Nauvoo, Illinois and founder of the Latter Day Saint movement, ran as an independent for U.S. president in 1844. He proposed the redemption of slaves by selling public lands, reducing the size and salary of Congress, the closure of prisons, the annexation of Texas, Oregon, and parts of Canada, the securing of international rights on the high seas, free trade, and the re-establishment of a national bank. Smith's top aide, Brigham Young, campaigned for Smith, saying, "He it is that God of Heaven designs to save this nation from destruction and preserve the Constitution." The campaign ended when Smith was killed by a mob while in the Carthage, Illinois, jail on June 27, 1844.

After severe persecution, the Mormons left the United States and resettled in a remote part of what is now Utah, (then part of Mexico). However the United States took control in 1848 and would not accept polygamy. The Mormon State of Deseret was short-lived. Its original borders stretched from western Colorado to the southern California coast. When the Mormons arrived in the valley of the Great Salt Lake in 1847, the Great Basin was still a part of Mexico and had no secular government. As a result, Brigham Young administered the region both spiritually and temporally through the highly organized and centralized Melchizedek Priesthood. This original organization, based upon Joseph Smith's concept of theodemocracy, instituted a governmental system combining biblical theocracy with mid-19th-century American political ideals.

In 1849 the Saints organized a secular government in Utah, although many ecclesiastical leaders maintained their positions of secular power. The Mormons also petitioned Congress to have Deseret admitted into the Union as a state. However, the Compromise of 1850 established Utah Territory, and U.S. President Millard Fillmore appointed Brigham Young as governor (in office 1851 to 1858)). In this situation, Young still stood as head of The Church of Jesus Christ of Latter-day Saints (LDS Church) as well as of Utah's secular government.

After the abortive Utah War of 1857–1858, the replacement of Young by an outside Federal Territorial Governor, intense federal prosecution of LDS Church leaders, the eventual resolution of controversies regarding plural marriage, and accession by Utah to statehood, the apparent temporal aspects of LDS theodemocracy receded markedly.

=== Egypt ===
Ancient Egyptian society regarded its pharaohs as divine and associated them with Horus, and after death, with Osiris. While not considered equal to other members of the Egyptian pantheon, the pharaoh had the responsibility of mediating between the gods and the people.

=== Florence ===
The short rule (1494–1498) of Girolamo Savonarola, a Dominican priest, over the city of Florence had features of a theocracy. During his rule, "unchristian" books, statues, poetry, and other items were burned (in the Bonfire of the Vanities), sodomy was made a capital offense, and other Christian practices became law.

=== Israel ===
In biblical times, Early Israel was a kritarchy, ruled by Judges before the institution of a monarchy under Saul. The Israelites regarded the Judges as representatives of God to dispense His judgement, and were often themselves prophets.

=== Japan ===
The Japanese people have historically venerated their emperor as the descendant of the Shinto sun-goddess Amaterasu. Through this line of descent, the emperor was seen as a living god who was the supreme leader of the Japanese people. This status only changed with the Occupation of Japan following the end of the Second World War in 1945: on 1 January 1946 Emperor Hirohito, at the request of Douglas MacArthur, declared that he was not a living god in order for Japan to reorganize into a democratic nation.

=== Mississippians ===
Many of the polities that existed within the Mississippian archaeological culture were ruled by theocrats who often held titles claiming to be 'children of the sun.' Some of them had power over life and death in their communities, reportedly sometimes killing people on a whim. Such polities includes Cahokia, Pafalaya, Ocute, Cofitachequi, and Coosa.

=== Mongolia ===
The Bogd Khanate period of Mongolia (1911–19) featured a Buddhist theocratic khanate.

=== Prince-Bishopric of Montenegro ===
The Prince-Bishopric of Montenegro existed as a Serbian Orthodox ecclesiastical principality from 1516 until 1852. The principality was located around modern-day Montenegro. It emerged from the Eparchy of Cetinje, later known as the Metropolitanate of Montenegro and the Littoral, whose bishops defied the Ottoman Empire overlordship and transformed the parish of Cetinje into a de facto theocracy, ruling it as Metropolitans (Vladike, also known as prince-bishops). The first prince-bishop was Vavila. The system was transformed into a hereditary one by Danilo Šćepčević, bishop of Cetinje from 1697 to 1735. He united the several tribes of Montenegro into fighting the Ottoman Empire that had occupied all of Montenegro (as the Sanjak of Montenegro and Montenegro Vilayet) and most of southeastern Europe at the time.

=== Polynesia ===
Pitirim Sorokin identified theocratic régimes in traditional Polynesia.

=== Protestant Theocracies ===
Many protestant groups attempted to form theocratic governments throughout their early history.

Between 1533 and 1535 the Protestant leaders Jan Mattys and John of Leiden erected a short-lived theocratic kingdom in the city of Münster in Westphalia. They established an Anabaptist régime of "New Jerusalem" with chiliastic and millenarian expectations. Money was abolished and any violations of the Ten Commandments were punished by death. Despite the pietistic ideology, polygamy was allowed, and von Leiden had 17 wives. In 1535, the Prince-Bishop of Münster, Franz von Waldeck, recaptured the city, ending the existence of the kingdom.

Historians debate the extent to which Geneva, Switzerland, in the days of John Calvin (1509–64) was a theocracy. On the one hand, Calvin's theology clearly called for separation between church and state. Other historians have stressed the enormous political power wielded on a daily basis by the clerics.

In nearby Zürich, Switzerland, Protestant reformer Huldrych Zwingli (1484–1531) built a political system that many scholars have called a theocracy, while others have denied it.

From 1620 until the American Revolution (but with many lingering traces extending into the modern era), Massachusetts colonies operated as strict theocracies, in which every white resident was required to belong to the Congregational (Puritan) Church. The leaders of the communities generally believed that they were carrying out the will of God, and they were often ministers. No religious deviation was tolerated. Any members of other sects were (initially) dispatched to Rhode Island. Later other forms of religious discrimination were uniformly practiced with governmental approval. (Today's Massachusetts and Maine formed one single colony/state until 1820.). Puritans and other groups such as the Diggers sought to establish theocratic governance in England as well.

=== Quebec ===
Quebec under the premiership of Maurice Duplessis (1936–1939 and 1944–1959) had attributes of a Roman Catholic theocracy. The church controlled education and healthcare, books and films were censored, drive-in movie theatres were illegal, religion had strong influence over civil law (for example, only churches could conduct marriages, and divorce was banned), and Jehovah's Witnesses were persecuted. This theocracy ended in 1960 with the beginning of the Quiet Revolution (1960–1966).

=== Rome ===
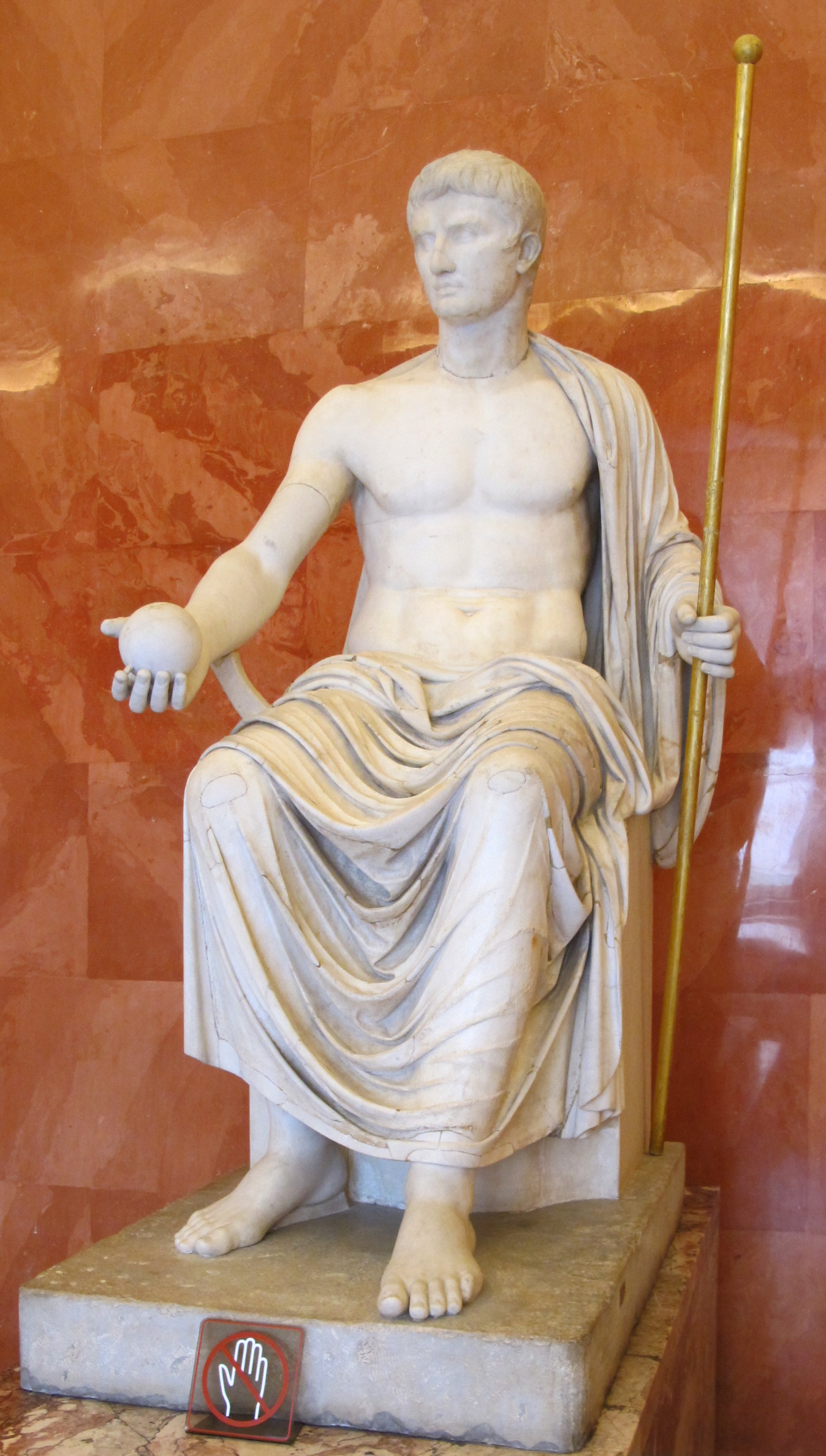
Roman emperor Augustus as Jupiter, holding scepter and orb (first half of 1st century AD)

From c. 27 BCE the Imperial cult of ancient Rome identified Roman emperors and some members of their families with the divinely sanctioned authority (auctoritas) of the Roman State. The official offer of cultus to a living emperor acknowledged his office and rule as divinely approved and constitutional: his Principate should therefore demonstrate pious respect for traditional republican deities and mores.

=== Sumer ===
Sumerian cities were probably theocratic and were most likely headed by a priest-king (ensi), assisted by a council of elders including both men and women.

=== Tibet ===
Unified religious rule in Buddhist Tibet began in 1642, when the Fifth Dalai Lama allied with the military power of the Mongol Gushri Khan to consolidate political power and to center control around his office as head of the Gelug school. This form of government is known as the dual system of government. Prior to 1642, particular monasteries and monks had held considerable power throughout Tibet but had not achieved anything approaching complete control, and their power continued in a diffuse, feudal system after the ascension of the Fifth Dalai Lama. Power in Tibet was held by a number of traditional élites, including members of the nobility, the heads of the major Buddhist sects (including their various tulkus), and various large and influential monastic communities.

=== Timurid and Mughal Empires ===
The Emperors of the Timurid and Mughal dynasty were regarded as intermediaries of their subordinates and God by virtue of the blessings of the Hazrat Ishaans, who were the spiritual guides of the Timurid and Mughal Emperors. The Emperors believed the Hazrat Ishaans to be the rightful spiritual successors of Muhammad and by this virtue to be the intermediaries between God and man.

=== Travancore ===
The state of Travancore adopted a form of theocracy in the 18th century under the King Marthanda Varma by donating the country to the Hindu deity Vishnu, and thereafter rule as the vice-regent of the deity. It is known as Thrippadidanam. The holding of the ritual might be a tactics move by the king on the model of the strategies of countries in Europe.

== See also ==
- General:
  - Autocracy
  - Clericalism
  - Clerical fascism
  - Collectivism
  - Divine law
  - Divine command theory
  - Fundamentalism
  - Philosopher king
  - Religious law
  - Religion
  - Rule according to higher law
  - Nontheistic religion
- Christian:
  - Christian fascism
  - Christian fundamentalism
  - Christian Identity
  - Christian reconstructionism
  - Christian right
  - Cuius regio, eius religio
  - Divine Right of Kings
  - Dominionism
  - Integralism
  - National Catholicism
  - Religious socialism
  - Temporal power (papal)
  - Theonomy
- Islamic:
  - Iranian Revolution
  - Islamic banking
  - Islamic fundamentalism
  - Islamic republic
  - Islamic state
  - Islamism
  - Islamofascism
  - Khomeinism
  - Political aspects of Islam
  - Religious police
  - Qutbism
  - Salafism
  - Taliban
- Jewish:
  - Fundamentalist Judaism
  - Kahanism
  - Halachic state
  - Kach Party (Israel)
- Others:
  - Devaraja
  - Divine right of kings
  - Hindu law
  - Khalistan
  - State Shinto (Japan)
  - State religion
