= Belcher Mound Site =

Archaeological site in Louisiana

- Location within Louisiana today
- 32°45′5.83″N 93°49′27.37″W
- Cultures: Caddoan Mississippian culture
- Location: Belcher, Louisiana, Caddo Parish, Louisiana, USA
- Region: Caddo Parish, Louisiana

History
- Built: 1400 CE

Site notes
- Architectural style: Platform mounds,
- Excavation dates: 1959 to 1969
- Archaeologists: Clarence H. Webb

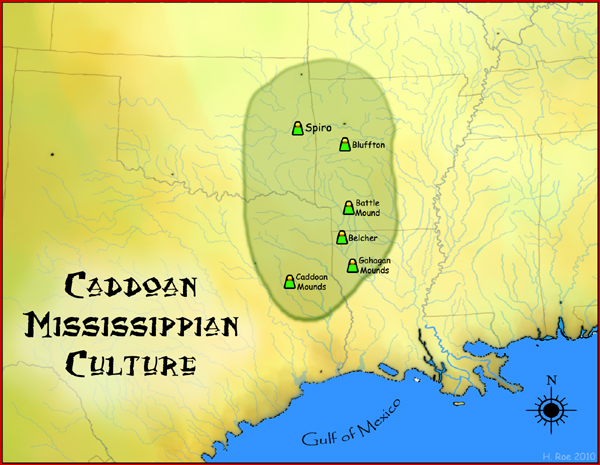
Map of the Caddoan Mississippian culture and some important sites, including the Belcher Mound Site

The Belcher Mound Site (16CD13) is an archaeological site in Caddo Parish, Louisiana. It is located in the Red River Valley 20 miles north of Shreveport and about one-half mile east of the town of Belcher, Louisiana. It was excavated by Clarence H. Webb from 1959 to 1969. The site gives its name to a local phase of the Caddoan Mississippian culture, the Belcher Phase, which radiocarbon dates suggest lasted from 1400 to 1600 CE.

== Site description ==
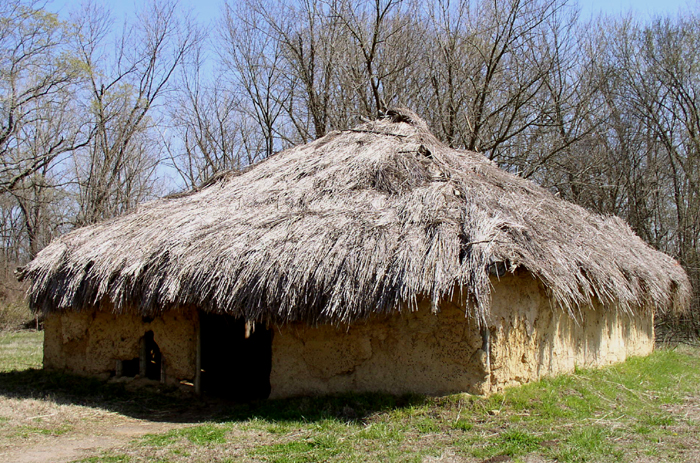
A reconstructed wattle and daub house at the Spiro Mounds Site

The Belcher Site was a ceremonial center with a mound, cemetery, and village area inhabited circa 900 - 1700 CE. The mound at Belcher was built in successive levels. Each layer had a structure, which was burned or deserted after a period of use, and the mound subsequently covered with a new layer and building. The earliest were rectangular wall trench structures with wattle and daub walls and grass thatched gable roofs. Later, circular structures with interior roof supports and central hearths were constructed atop the mound. These were constructed with the same materials, but subdivided into compartments for several living and cooking arrangements. The structures atop the mounds are thought to have been ceremonial lodges or the homes of chieftains.

=== Burial practices ===
The people of the site buried their dead in pits beneath the floors of their houses. In excavations between 1936 and 1954, the remains of forty six individuals and their funerary objects were removed by Dr. Webb, who donated these remains and objects to the Louisiana State University Museum of Natural Science in 1974. The grave goods included earthenware pottery, a ceramic spindle whorl and hair ornament, a stone celt and shell artifacts. The remains were determined to be related to ancestors of the Caddo Nation of Oklahoma and returned to them under the NAGPRA Act.

=== Food ===
The people of the Belcher site were full-time agriculturalist, who grew a variety of domesticated plants. Food remains found include maize and beans. They also collected a variety of wild foodstuffs such as hickory nuts, persimmon seeds, and pecans. Mussel, gar, catfish, buffalo, sheepshead, bowfin, and turtle were taken from the local waterways. Whitetail deer, rabbit, squirrel, fox, mink, and birds were hunted in the local woodlands.

=== Tools ===
The Belcher people made tools such as celts(axes), arrow points, flint scrapers and gravers, and sandstone hones from a variety of rocks. They also made awls, needles and chisels from animal bones, and hoes for farming from mussel shells.

== Belcher Phase ==
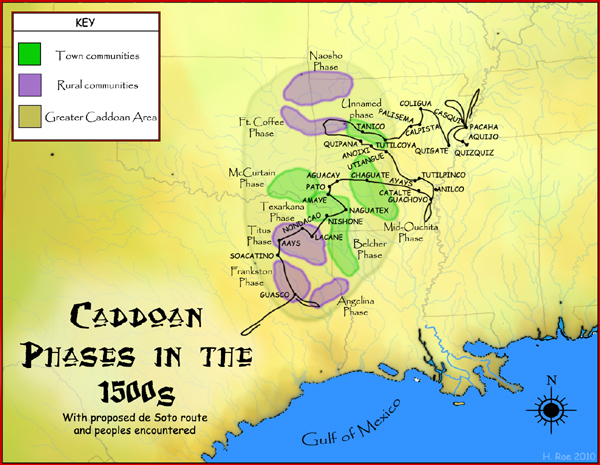
Hernando de Soto route through the Caddo area, with known archaeological phases of the time, including Belcher

Archaeological investigations in the area have determined that the Belcher Phase began about 1400 and existed until 1600 CE. During its beginning, Belcher culture probably overlapped and coexisted with Bossier culture. Its neighbors were the Texarkana Phase on the Red River northwest of Texarkana, Texas and the McCurtain Phase even further upstream. Belcher Phase sites are found from Fulton, Arkansas to just below Shreveport.

Sites in the Texarkana and Belcher Phase areas were an assortment of sizes, from large, permanent settlements with mounds and cemeteries, to smaller dispersed hamlets and farmsteads. The people of these settlements were maize agriculturalists with complex societies led by high status individuals who lived at the mound centers such as the Belcher Mound, the Battle Mound, Hatchel-Mitchell Site (part of the Texarkana Phase Archeological District), and Cabe Mounds. Hamlets or farmsteads, such as the Cedar Grove Site and Spirit Lake Site for the Belcher phase and the Sherwin Site and Atlanta State Park Site for the Texarkana Phase have also been investigated.

== See also ==
- Spiro Mounds
- List of Mississippian sites
