= Goforth-Saindon Mound Group =

Archaeological site in Arkansas, United States

- U.S. National Register of Historic Places
- Nearest city: Siloam Springs, Arkansas
- Area: 33.3 acres (13.5 ha)
- NRHP reference No.: 86000099
- Added to NRHP: January 23, 1986

The Goforth-Saindon Mound Group is a prehistoric archaeological site near Siloam Springs, Arkansas. The site, which is one of the only known Caddoan Mississippian culture mound sites in the western Ozark highlands, is significant for providing a series of datable strata encompassing the entire period of that culture in the region. The connection between this site and other sites further southwest (notably the Harlan Mound Site in Oklahoma) is exemplified by similarities in the layout of their features.

The site was listed on the National Register of Historic Places in 1986.

== See also ==
- National Register of Historic Places listings in Benton County, Arkansas
