= Bluffton Mound site =

Archaeological site in Arkansas, US

Coordinates: 34.91106°N 93.60774°W

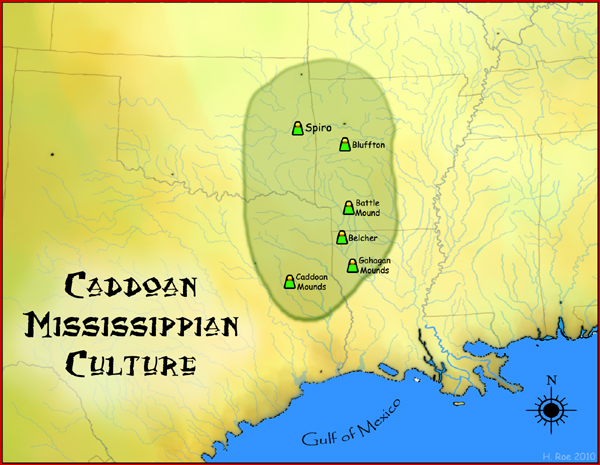
Map of the Caddoan Mississippian culture and some important sites, including the Bluffton Mound Site

The Bluffton Mound Site is a Caddoan Mississippian culture archaeological site in Yell County, Arkansas on the Fourche La Fave River.

== See also ==
- Spiro Mounds
- List of Mississippian sites
