= Collectivism (disambiguation) =

Collectivism is a type of social organization.

Collectivism may also refer to:

- Collectivism, a psychological, ethical, and social perspective that emphasizes collective relationship networks, in contrast to individualism.
- Bureaucratic collectivism, a theory of class society which is used to describe the Soviet Union under Joseph Stalin
- Collectivist anarchism, a socialist doctrine in which the workers own and manage the production
- Collectivism (art), art which is created by a group of people rather than an individual
- Communitarianism, a political position that emphasizes the importance of the community over the individual or attempts to integrate the two
- Corporatism, a political ideology in which groups, rather than individuals, are the building blocks of society

== See also ==
- Collective
- Collective farming, aka collectivization
- Collective security
- Collective ownership
- Collective agreement
