= Battle Mound Site =

Archaeological site in Arkansas, US

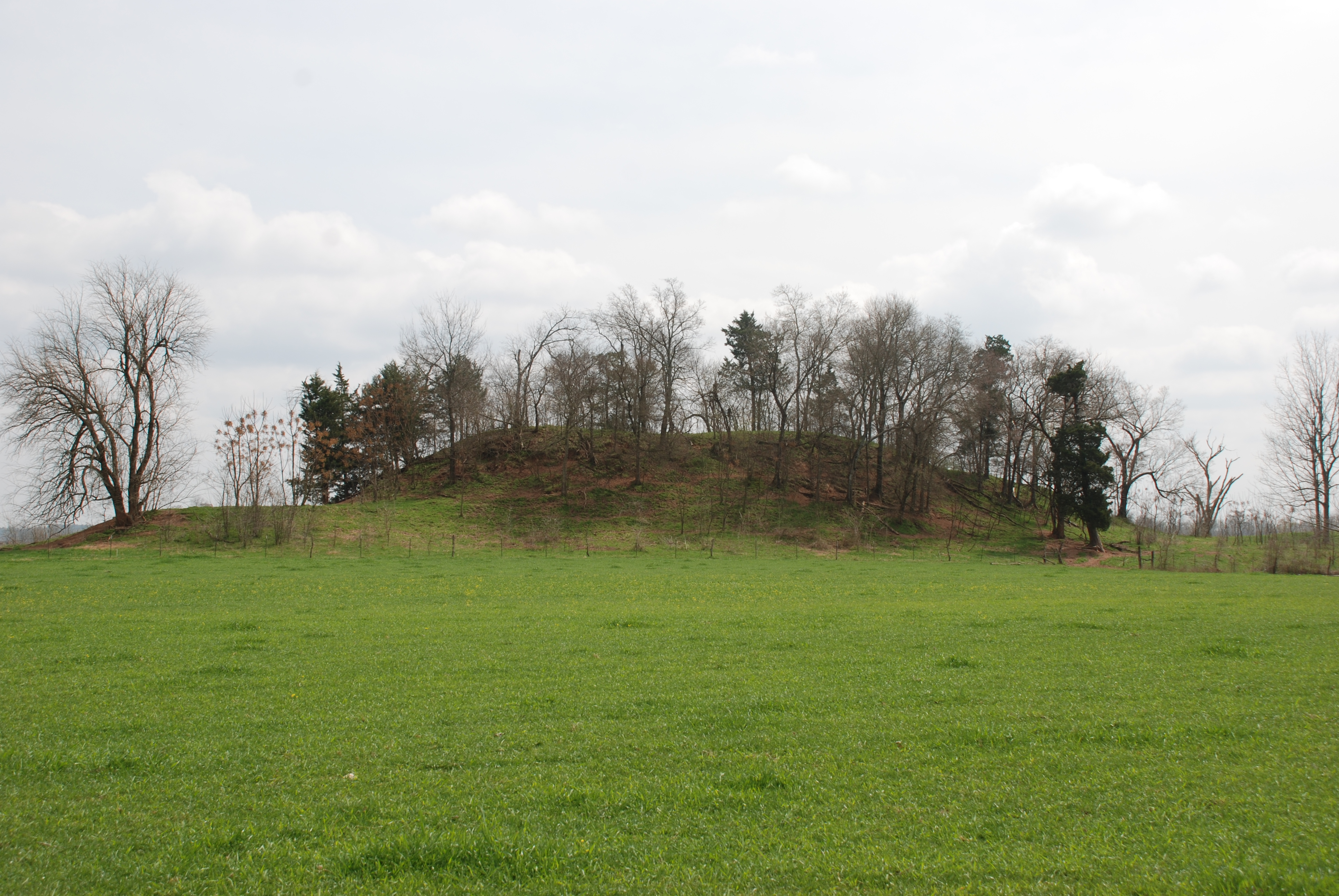
- Interactive map of Battle Mound Site
- 33°17′56″N 93°40′24.5″W
- Cultures: Caddoan Mississippian culture
- Location: Lewisville, Lafayette County, Arkansas, USA
- Region: Great Bend Region of the Red River

History
- Built: 1200 CE
- Abandoned: 1400 CE

Site notes
- Architectural style: Platform mound
- Excavation dates: 1948 (unpublished)
- Archaeologists: Dr. Alex D. Krieger, Duncan P. McKinnon

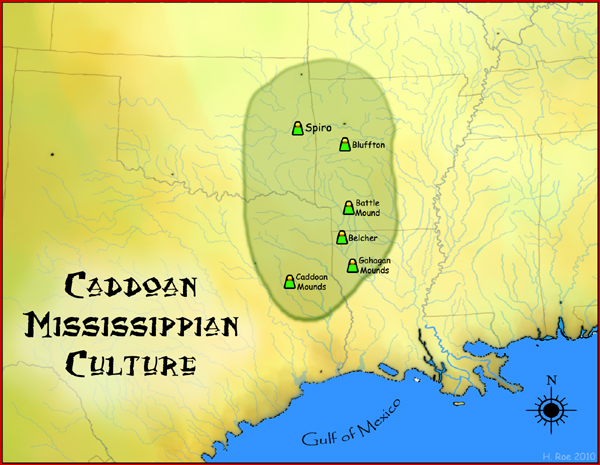
Map of the Caddoan Mississippian culture and some important sites, including the Battle Mound Site

The Battle Mound Site (3LA1) is an archaeological site in Lafayette County, Arkansas in the Great Bend region of the Red River basin. The majority of the mound was built from 1200 to 1400 CE. The site has the largest mound of the Caddoan Mississippian culture (a regional variation of the Mississippian culture). It measures approximately 670 feet (200 m) in length, 320 feet (98 m) wide, and 34 feet (10 m) in height.

Four low rises at the site are believed also to have been constructed earthwork mounds. Many burial grounds, occupation areas, and other mound sites in the area may be connected with this site. Minor investigations were conducted at the site by Dr. Alex D. Krieger of the University of Texas at Austin and his assistant Mr. Lynn E. Howard, between June 25 and September 11, 1948. The field notes and a full analysis of the excavation have not been published. In recent years archaeologist Duncan P. McKinnon has been conducting research at the site using archaeogeophysical means.

== See also ==
- Spiro Mounds
- List of Mississippian sites
