= Spiro Mounds =

Archaeological site in Oklahoma, US

- Spiro Mound Group
- U.S. National Register of Historic Places
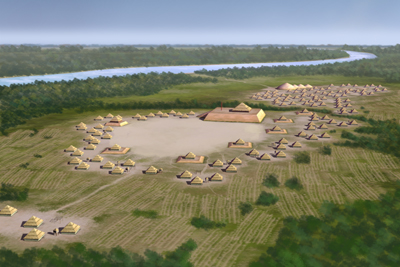
- Artist's conception of Spiro Mounds, viewed from the west

- Location within Oklahoma Location within the United States
- Nearest city: Spiro, Oklahoma
- Coordinates: 35°18′43″N 94°34′07″W
- Area: Le Flore County
- Architectural style: Mississippian
- NRHP reference No.: 69000153
- Added to NRHP: September 30, 1969

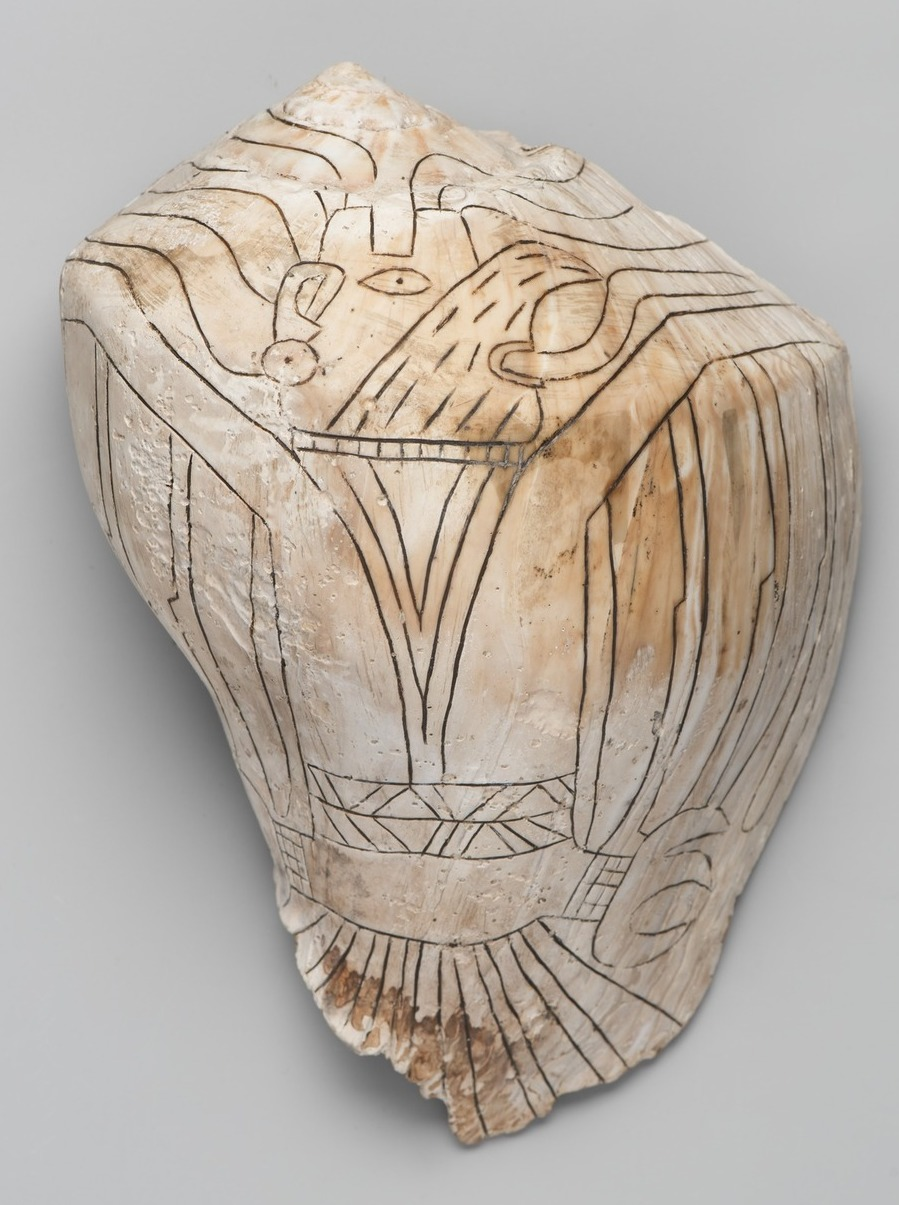
Engraved whelk shell from Spiro Mounds depicting a falcon warrior

Spiro Mounds (34 LF 40) is an Indigenous archaeological site located in present-day eastern Oklahoma. The site was built by people from the Arkansas Valley Caddoan culture that was part of the Mississippian culture. The 150-acre site is located within a floodplain on the southern side of the Arkansas River. The modern town of Spiro developed approximately seven miles to the south.

Between the 9th and 15th centuries, the local Indigenous people created a religious and political center, culturally linked to the Southeastern Ceremonial Complex identified by anthropologists as the Mississippian Ideological Interaction Sphere (MIIS). Spiro was one of four regional centers used by the Caddoan Mississippian culture. These four centers were Cahokia, located in present-day East St. Louis, Moundville, in present-day Alabama, Etowah, in present-day Georgia, and Spiro. Spiro was a major western outpost of Mississippian culture which dominated the Mississippi Valley and its tributaries for centuries.

In the 1930s during the Great Depression, treasure hunters bought the rights to tunnel into Craig Mound—the second-largest mound on the site—to mine it for artifacts. Without concern for scientific research, they exposed a hollow burial chamber inside the mound, a unique feature containing some of the most extraordinary pre-Columbian artifacts ever found in the United States. The treasure hunters sold the artifacts they recovered to art collectors, some as far away as Europe. The artifacts included works of fragile, perishable materials: textiles and feathers that had been uniquely preserved in the conditions of the closed chamber.

Later, steps were taken to protect the site. This site has been significant for North American archaeology since the 1930s, especially due to its many preserved textiles and a wealth of shell carving. Later, some of the artifacts sold by treasure hunters were returned to regional museums and the Caddo Nation, but many artifacts from the site have never been accounted for.

Since the late 20th century, the Spiro Mounds site has been protected by the Oklahoma Historical Society and it is listed on the National Register of Historic Places.

== Chronology ==
Typically, the history of the Spiro culture is divided into archaeological phases:

- Evans Phase (900–1050 CE)
- Harlan Phase (1050–1250 CE)
- Norman Phase (1250–1350 CE)
- Spiro phase (1350–1450 CE)

Residential construction at Spiro decreased dramatically around 1250 CE, and the people resettled in nearby villages, such as the Choates-Holt Site to the north. Most of the mounds were built during the Harlan Phase. Spiro continued to be used as a ceremonial and mortuary center through 1450. The mound area was abandoned about 1450, but nearby communities persisted until 1600 CE.

The historic cultures following in the wake of Spiro, such as the Caddo, Pawnee, and Wichita peoples, were less complex and hierarchical.

== Mounds and plaza area ==
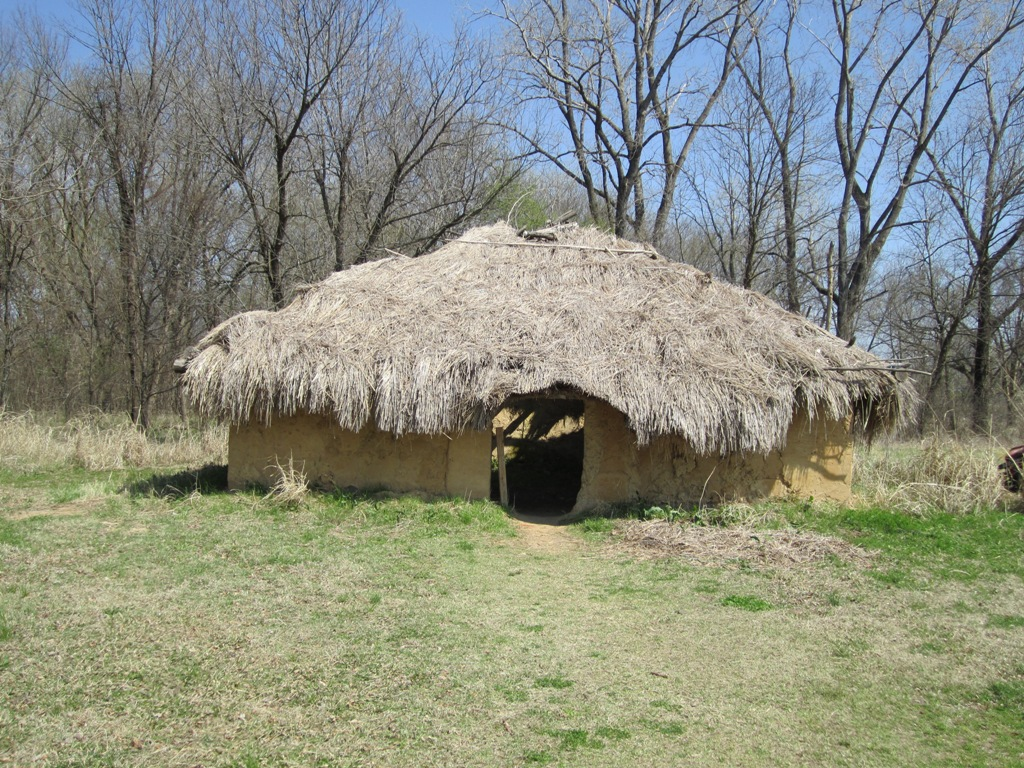
A reconstructed Spiroan house. Grass-thatched roofs were typical of more recent historical Wichita and Caddo cultures, who also made round grass lodges.

Mississippian culture spread along the lower Mississippi River and its tributaries between the 9th and 16th centuries. The largest Mississippian settlement was Cahokia, the capital of a major chiefdom that built a six-mile-square city east of the Mississippi River that now is St. Louis, Missouri, in present-day southern Illinois.

Archeological studies have revealed that Mississippian culture extended from the Great Lakes to the Gulf Coast, along the Ohio River, and into both the lowland and mountain areas of the Southeast. Mississippian settlements were known for their large earthwork, platform mounds (usually truncated pyramids), surmounted by temples, the houses of warrior kings and priests, and the burial houses of the elite. The mounds were arranged around large, constructed flat plazas believed to be used for ceremonial community gathering and ritual games. Archaeological research has shown that Mississippian settlements such as Cahokia and Spiro took part in a vast trading network that covered the eastern half of what is now the U.S. and parts of what is now the western U.S. as well.

The Spiro site includes 12 earthen mounds and 150 acres of land. The mounds were constructed from basketfuls of dirt, layer by layer. Of the 12 mounds, there is one burial mound, two temple mounds, and 9 house mounds. As in other Mississippian-culture towns, the people built a number of large, complex earthworks. These included mounds surrounding a large, planned and leveled central plaza, where important religious rituals, the politically and culturally significant game of chunkey, and other important community activities were carried out. The population lived in a village that bordered the plaza. In addition, archaeologists have found more than twenty related village sites within five miles of the main town. Other village sites linked to Spiro through culture and trade have been found up to a 100 miles (160 km) away.

Spiro has been the site of human activity for at least 8,000 years. It was a major Mississippian settlement from 800 to 1450 AD. The cultivation of maize during this period allowed accumulation of crop surpluses and the gathering of more dense populations. The town was the headquarters of a regional chiefdom, whose powerful leaders directed the building of eleven platform mounds and one burial mound in an 80-acre (0.32 km^{2}) area on the south bank of the Arkansas River. The heart of the site is a group of nine mounds surrounding an oval plaza. These mounds were the bases of the homes of important leaders or formed the foundations for religious structures that focused the attention of the community.

Brown Mound, the largest platform mound, is located on the eastern side of the plaza. It had an earthen ramp that gave access to the summit from the northern side. Here, atop Brown Mound and the other mounds, the inhabitants of the town carried out complex rituals, centered especially on the deaths and burials of Spiro's powerful rulers.

Archaeologists have shown that Spiro had a large resident population until about 1250. Around that time, the Little Ice Age caused seasonal rains to become less predictable. Because of this, the priests at Spiro Mounds filled existing burial mounds with their most precious objects including capes, axes, and rare minerals, in order to bring back the seasonal rains. After that, most of the population moved to other towns nearby. Spiro continued to be used as a regional ceremonial center and burial ground until about 1450. Its ceremonial and mortuary functions continued and seem to have increased after the main population moved away.

=== The Great Mortuary ===
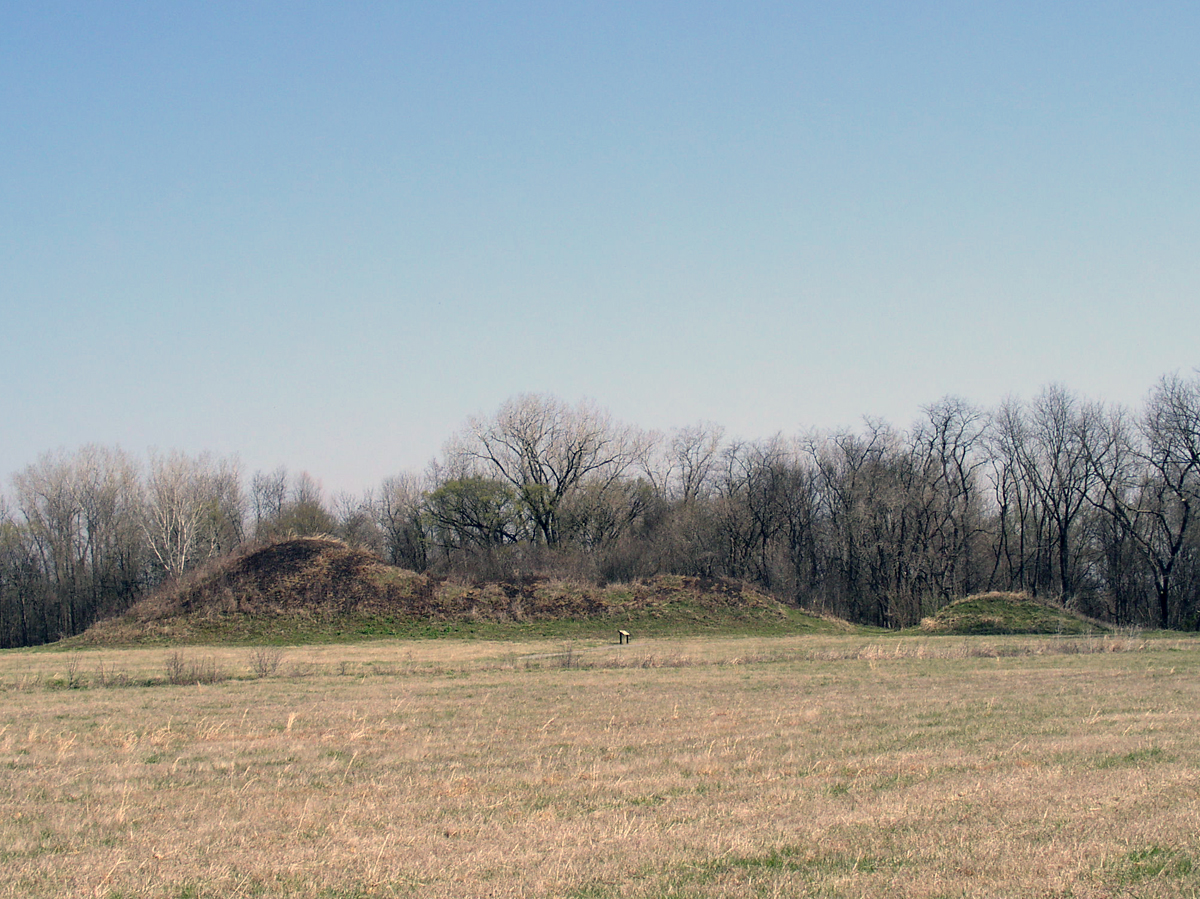
Craig Mound, the Spiro burial mound that was referred to as the "Great Mortuary" by archaeologists conducting the early scientific research at the site

Craig Mound—also called "The Spiro Mound"—is the second-largest mound on the site and the only burial mound. Elite individuals were buried at the Craig Mound in Spiro between 950 and 1450. It is located approximately 1,500 feet (460 m) southeast of the plaza. A cavity created within the mound, approximately 10 feet (3.0 m) high and 15 feet (4.6 m) wide, allowed for almost perfect preservation of fragile artifacts made of wood, conch shell, and copper. The conditions in this hollow space were so favorable that objects made of perishable materials such as basketry, woven fabric of plant and animal fibers, lace, fur, and feathers were preserved inside it. In historic tribes, such objects have traditionally been created by women. Also found inside were several examples of Mississippian stone statuary made from Missouri flint clay and Mill Creek chert bifaces, all thought to have originally come from the Cahokia site in Illinois.

The "Great Mortuary", as archaeologists called this hollow chamber, appears to have begun as a burial structure for Spiro's rulers. It was created as a circle of sacred cedar posts sunk in the ground and angled together at the top similarly to a tipi. The cone-shaped chamber was covered with layers of earth to create the mound, preventing collapse. Some scholars believe that minerals percolating through the mound hardened the log walls of the chamber, making them resistant to decay and shielding the perishable artifacts inside from direct contact with the earth. No other Mississippian mound has been found with such a hollow space inside it, nor with such spectacular preservation of artifacts. Craig Mound has been called "an American King Tut's Tomb".

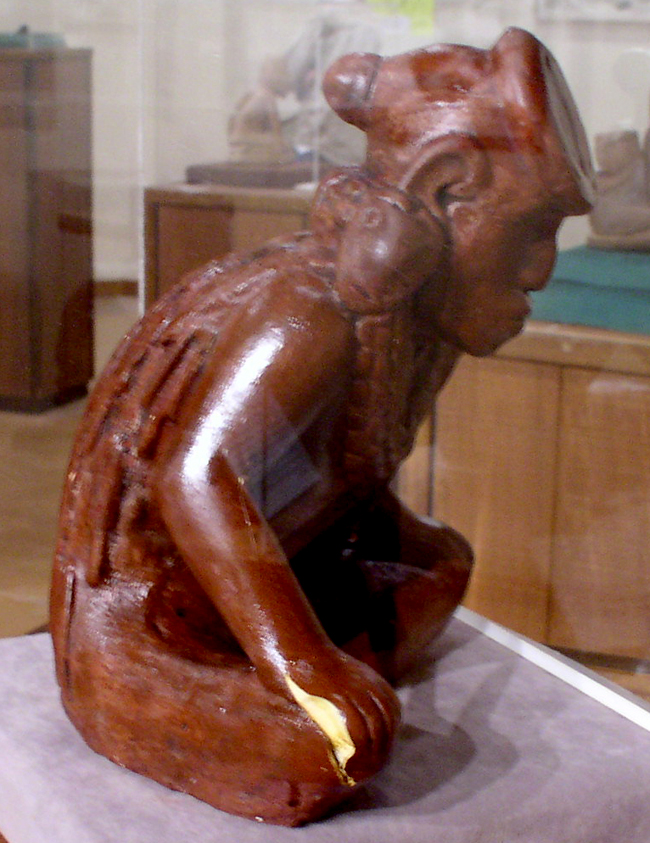
"Resting Warrior", side view, effigy pipe of Missouri flint clay

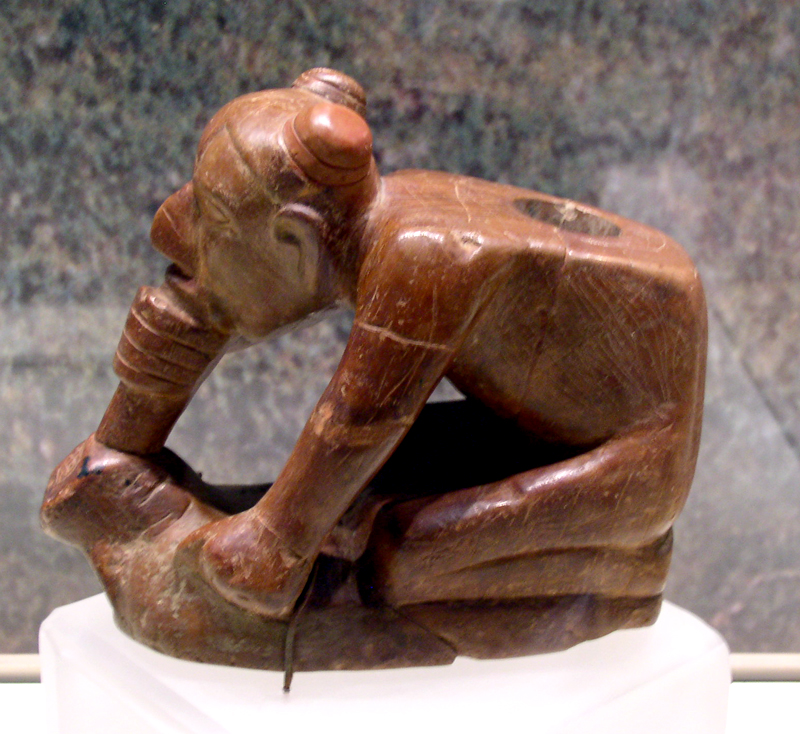
Effigy pipe of figure smoking from a frog effigy pipe, Missouri flint clay

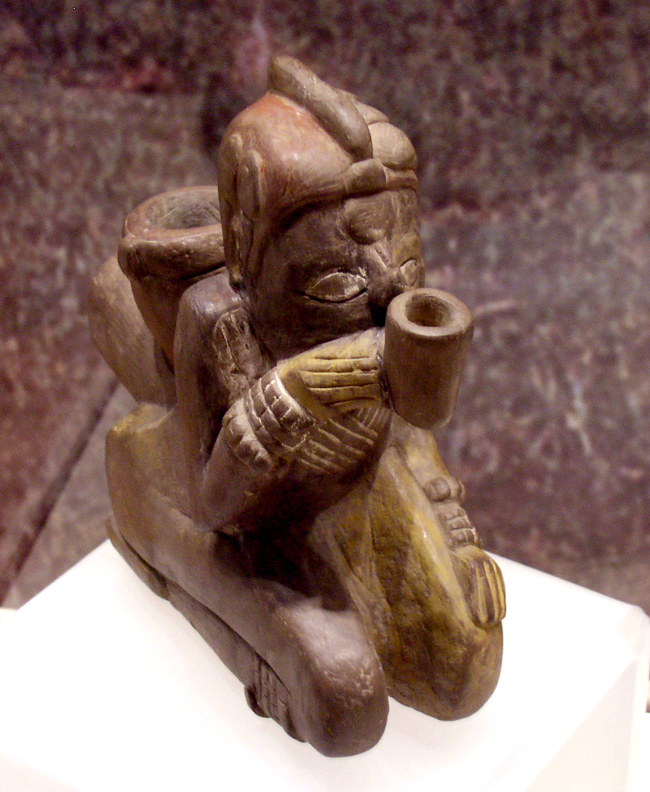
Effigy pipe of a man smoking a pipe, Missouri flint clay

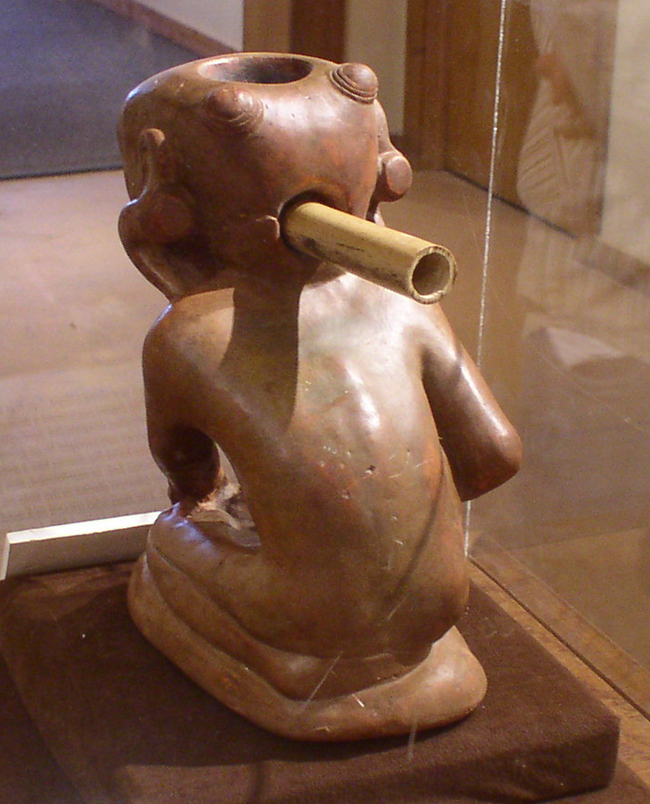
"Lucifer" pipe, rear view

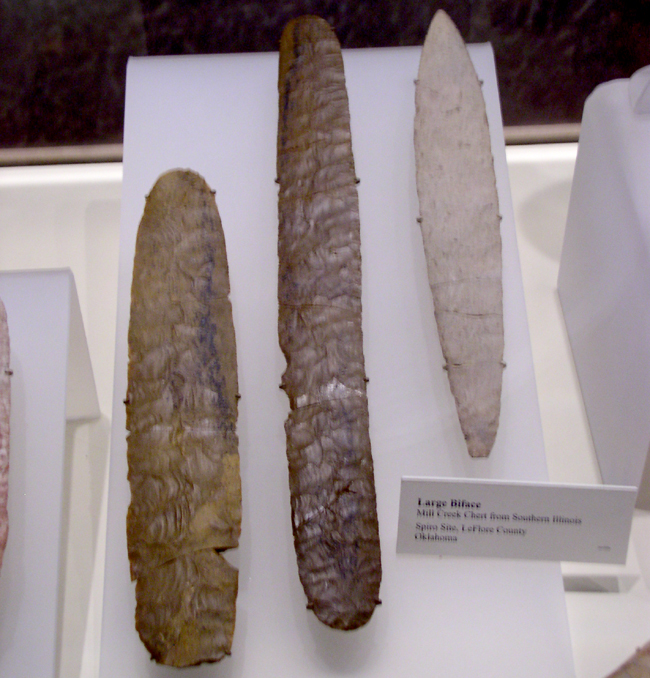
Two jasper and one Mill Creek chert ceremonial bifaces (from southern Illinois)

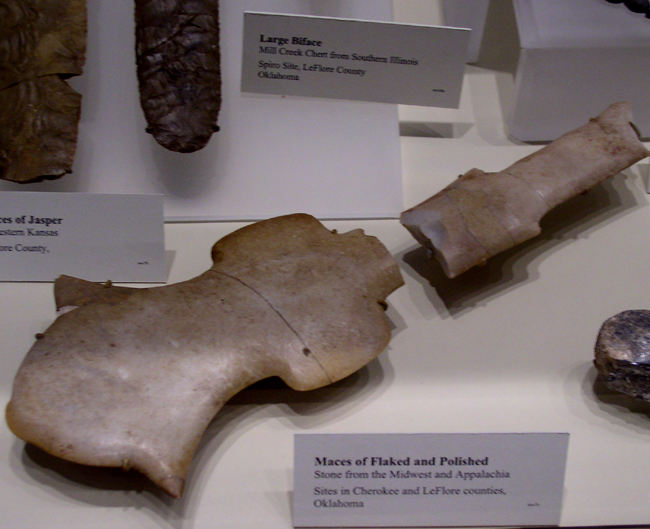
Ceremonial monolithic flint mace

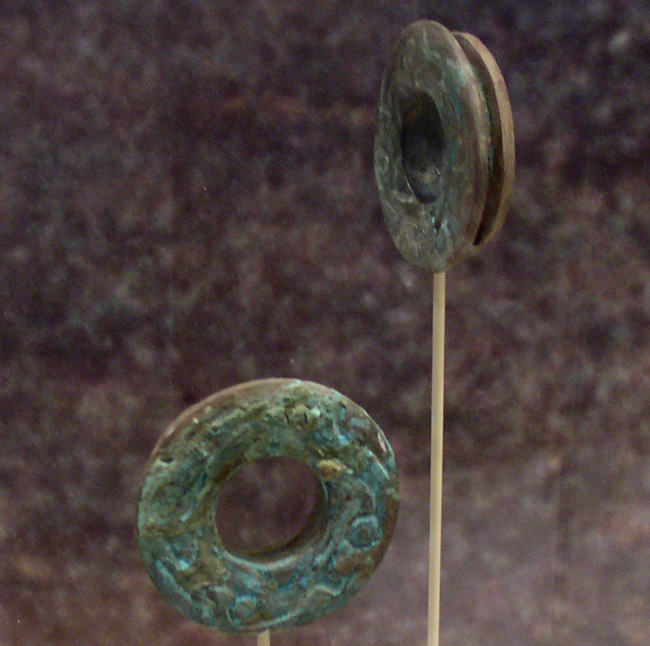
Copper ear spools

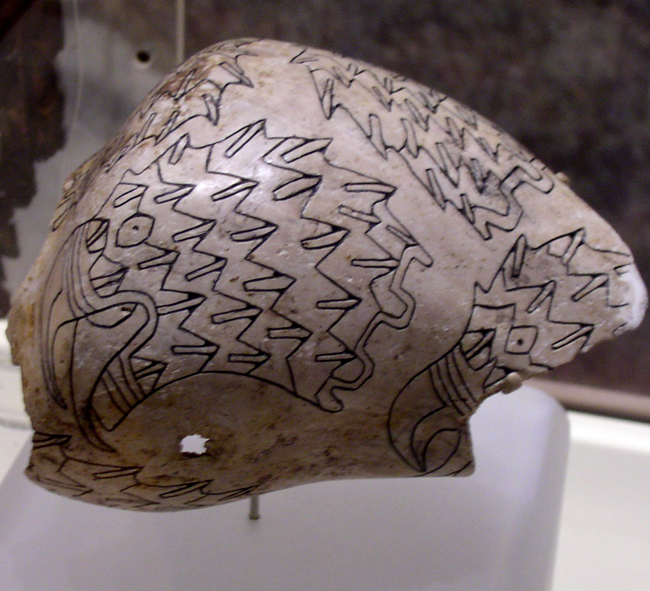
Engraved whelk shell cup with raptor heads

Funded by the Works Progress Administration (WPA), archaeologists from the University of Oklahoma excavated parts of the site between 1936 and 1941. The Oklahoma Historical Society established the Spiro Mounds Archaeological Center in 1978 that continues to operate. The site is listed on the National Register of Historic Places and is preserved as Oklahoma's only Archeological State Park and only pre-contact Native American site open to the public.

== Southeastern Ceremonial Complex ==
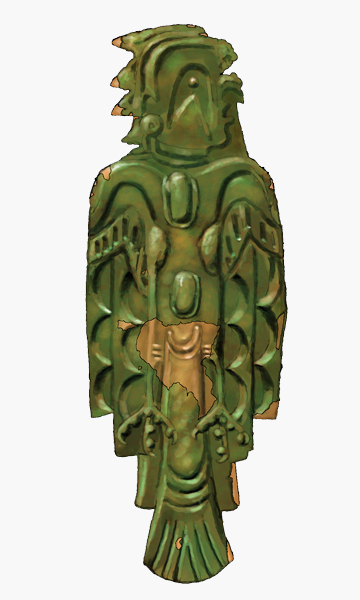
Anthropomorphic human headed avian plate from Spiro

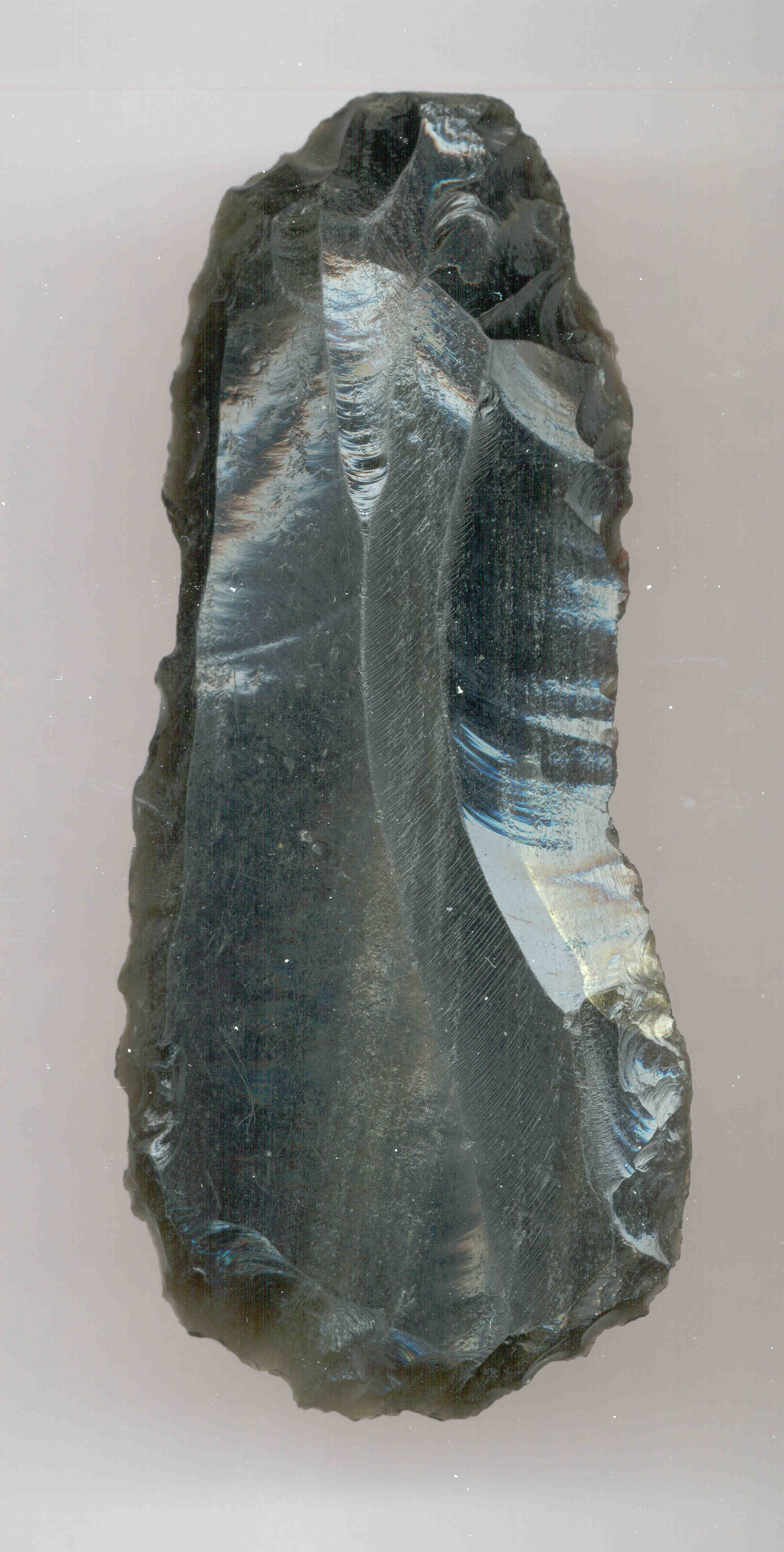
Obsidian scraper found at Spiro Mounds, Oklahoma, made from green obsidian that was sourced from Pachuca, Mexico; an example of vast Pre-Columbian trade networks

Spiro Mounds people participated in what cultural anthropologists and archaeologists call the Southeastern Ceremonial Complex (SECC), a network of ceremonial centers sharing the Mississippian culture and similar spiritual beliefs, cosmology, ritual practices, and cult objects. The complex was a vast trading network that distributed exotic materials from all across North America that were used in the making of ritual objects. These materials included colored flint from New Mexico, copper from the Great Lakes, conch (or lightning whelk) shells from the Gulf Coast, and mica from the Carolinas. Other Mississippian centers also traded in these prized resources, but apparently, Spiro was the only trading center that acquired obsidian from Mexico, with a scraper found at Spiro having been made from green obsidian from Pachuca, Mexico. Using these valued materials, Mississippian artists created exquisite works of art reflecting their cultural identity and their complex spiritual beliefs.

When commercial excavators dug into Craig Mound in the 1930s, they found many beautifully crafted ritual artifacts, including stone effigy pipes, polished stone maces, finely made flint knives and arrow points, polished chunkey stones, copper effigy axes, Mississippian copper plates (Spiro plates), mica effigy cut outs, elaborately engraved conch shell ornaments, pearl bead necklaces, stone earspools, wood carvings inlaid with shell, and specially made mortuary pottery. The conch shells were fashioned into gorgets and drinking cups engraved with intricate designs representing costumed humans, real and mythical animals, and geometric motifs, all of which had profound symbolic significance. The Spiro Mounds ceremonial objects are among the finest examples of pre-Columbian art in North America.

Later, archaeologists recognised that the ritual artifacts at Spiro were similar to comparable objects excavated at other powerful Mississippian polities that also participated in the Southeastern Ceremonial Complex. These include Cahokia in Illinois, the largest Mississippian town; Etowah and Ocmulgee in Georgia; and Moundville in Alabama. In economic terms, Spiro seems to have been a gateway town that funneled valuable resources from the Great Plains and other western regions to the main Mississippian ceremonial centers farther east. In return, it received valuable goods from those other centers. Spiro's location on the Arkansas River, one of the principal tributaries of the Mississippi River, gave the Spiro traders access to the Mississippian heartland.

Spiro and other Mississippian towns clearly looked to the great city of Cahokia, in what now is southern Illinois, as a cultural model to be emulated. Located about 400 miles northeast of Spiro near the confluence of the Mississippi and Missouri Rivers, Cahokia was the largest and most impressive of all the Mississippian towns. Mineralogical analysis of some of the most beautiful stone effigy pipes found at Spiro, including the famous "Grizzly Man" or "Kneeling Rattler" pipe, have shown they came from Cahokia, based on the material from which they were made. Cahokia also influenced the styles of the artifacts made at Spiro. Archaeologists have identified four distinct styles: the Braden Style characteristic of artifacts brought from Cahokia and the Craig A, B, and C styles that are local derivatives of the Braden Style.

Antonio Waring and Preston Holder first defined the Southeastern Ceremonial Complex in the 1940s, according to a series of distinct cultural traits. Since the late 1980s, archaeologists have adopted a new classification scheme that is based on their greatly improved understanding of Mississippian cultural development. The new scheme divides the SECC into five periods, or horizons, each defined by the appearance of new ritual objects and cultural motifs connected with new developments in politics and long-distance trade. Archaeologists have determined that Spiro was at the peak of its cultural importance in the 13th and 14th centuries.

== The Pocola Mining Company ==
In 1936, a group of five prospectors were able to lease Spiro Mounds for $300. The group created The Pocola Mining Company. They dug a tunnel into Craig Mound and excavated thousands of pounds of artifacts. They found pearls, stone beads, shells, bones, ceremonial swords, stone axes, armor, pipes, urns, cups, copper plates, and ear plugs. Notably, they also found a copper box with surgical instruments inside. The shells at the site contained engravings of ceremonies that took place at Spiro Mounds. The miners discarded human remains, textiles, basketry, and feathers, most of which disintegrated before scholars could analyze them, although some were sold to collectors. The company destroyed about one-third of the artifacts found in Craig Mound. When the commercial excavators finished, they dynamited the burial chamber and sold the commercially valuable artifacts, made of stone, pottery, copper, and conch shell, to collectors in the United States and overseas. Most of these valuable objects are lost, but some have been returned through donation and have been documented by scholars. Because of this destruction, the Oklahoma State Legislature passed a law protecting the site, causing The Pocola Mining Company to shut down.

== Mississippian iconography ==
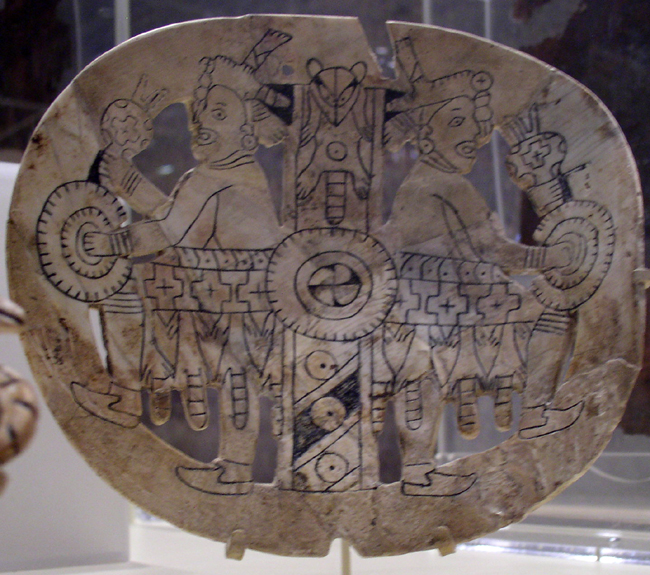
Engraved shell gorget from Spiro Mounds—the striped-center-pole, or axis mundi, divides the image in half—the cross and circle motifs also have symbolic meaning

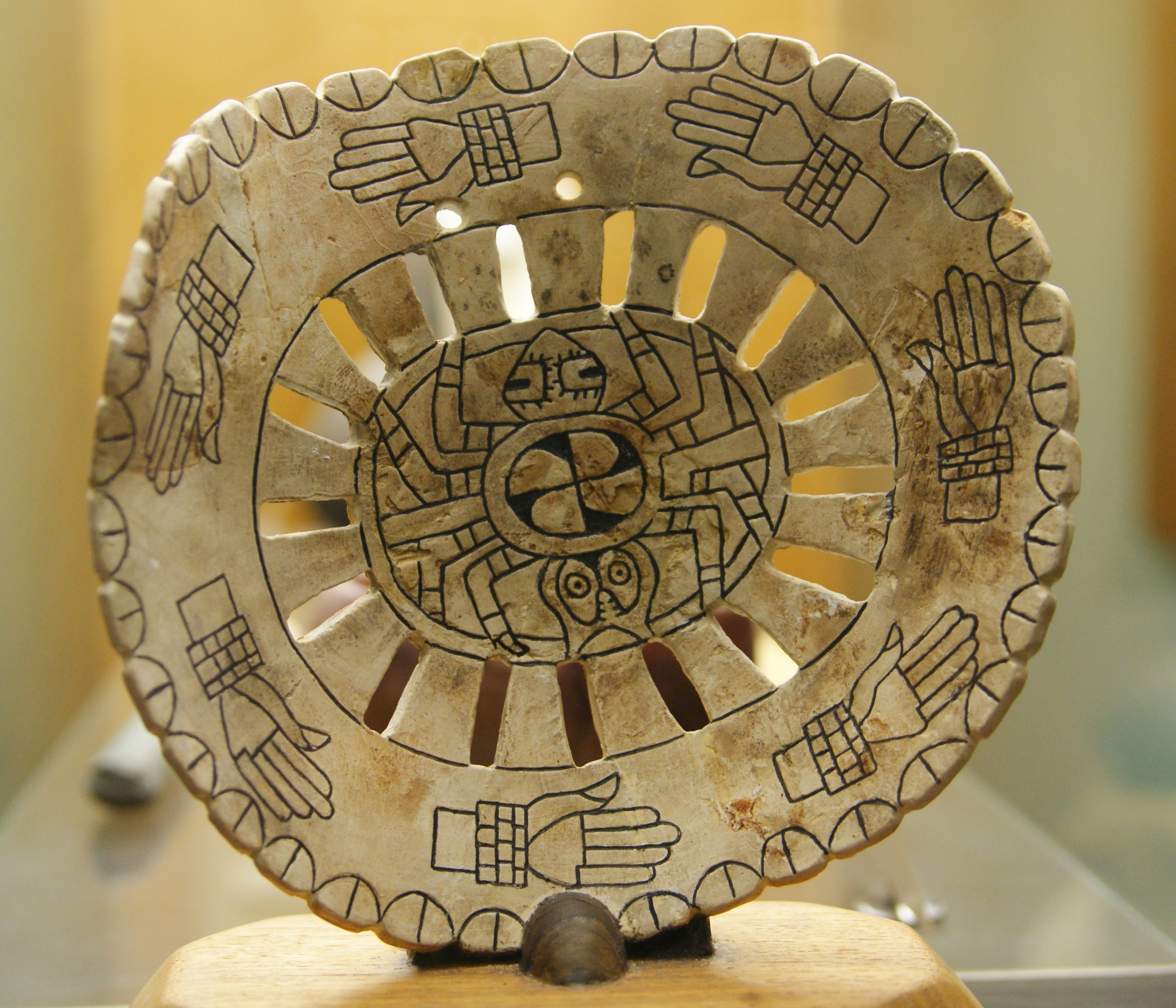
Spiro Mounds shell gorget with a central spider motif and a border of hands with bracelets, Woolaroc Museum

Anthropologists have tried in recent years to interpret the meaning of the ritual artifacts and artistic imagery found at Spiro and other Mississippian sites. While reaching firm conclusions about the meanings of works of art made centuries ago by people of an extinct culture is difficult, they have made some compelling interpretations by comparing Mississippian artistic imagery with the myths, religious rituals, art, and iconography of historic Native American groups.

One of the most prominent symbols at Spiro is the "Birdman", a winged human figure representing a warrior or chunkey player. Chunkey has been played by tribes from the far Southeastern Woodlands to the Northern Plains. Based upon historic records, the game consisted of players rolling a stone disk for a considerable distance and then hurling spears as close as they could to the point where the stone stopped.

Another Spiro icon is the "Great Serpent", a being said to inhabit the Under World, the spiritual domain on the opposite side of the Mississippian universe. The Great Serpent is portrayed in Mississippian art with a serpent's body, but also with wings or horns. Similar beings were the subject of myth in historic times among the Micmac, Huron, Kickapoo, Cherokee, Muscogee Creek, Caddo, and other Native American tribes, representing at least three major language families. The spiritual beings of the Under World were thought to be in constant opposition to those in the Upper World. Humans had to fear these beings, according to Native American mythology, but they could also gain great power from them in certain circumstances.

Mississippian art also features the cedar tree or striped-center-pole motifs, which researchers have interpreted as the axis mundi, the point at which the three parts of the Mississippian spiritual universe come together: the Upper World, the Under World, and the Middle World where humans dwell. Often, the cedar tree, or the striped-center-pole, is found on engraved conch shell gorgets, with human or animal figures positioned on either side. The concept of an axis mundi—the point where different cosmic domains converge—is found in many cultures around the world. It is frequently represented as a tree (including the Tree of Life), since trees pass through the surface of the earth and connect the subsurface and the sky. The fact that the Great Mortuary at Spiro was built with cedar (or cedar elm) posts suggests that the burial chamber was meant to be a point of departure from one spiritual domain to another, as cedar was a sacred wood.

Archaeologists found that one of the conch shell cups from Craig Mound had a black residue in the bottom. This suggests that the Spiro people may have practiced a version of the Black Drink Ceremony, a purification ritual that was also performed in historic times by their descendants—the Southeastern tribes. Participants drank a tea made from the Yaupon Holly from conch shell cups.

== Caddoan Mississippians ==
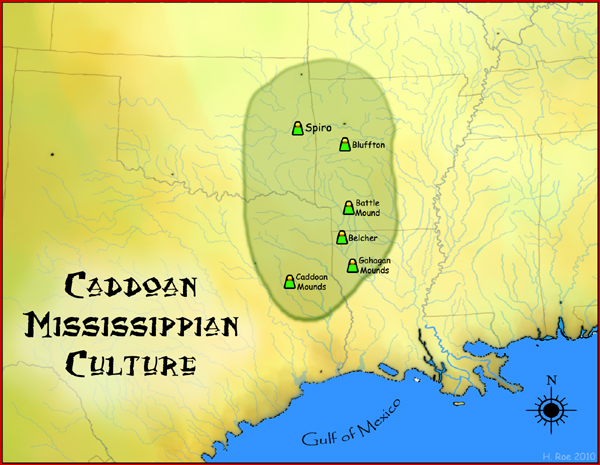
Map of the Caddoan Mississippian culture and some important sites

Most authorities agree that the people of Spiro were Caddoan speaking, but their descendants in historic times are difficult to identify. Archaeologists describe the cultures that built and used Spiro and surrounding sites as the Arkansas Valley Caddoan culture. The Caddoan people occupied the Red River Valley in Louisiana, and the river's tributaries in Louisiana, Arkansas, Texas, and Oklahoma. Anthropologists speculate that the Caddo Confederacy, Wichita, Kichai, or non-Caddoan Tunica, could be their descendants. However, the cultures of all these peoples, when encountered by the Spanish and French in the 16th and 17th centuries, were substantially different from that of Spiro.

Under the Native American Graves Protection and Repatriation Act, the Caddo Nation of Oklahoma and the Wichita and Affiliated Tribes (Wichita, Keechi, Waco and Tawakonie) are recognized by the U.S. Federal government, cultural anthropologists, and archaeologists as the cultural descendants of the builders of Spiro Mounds.

When the Spanish conquistador Hernando de Soto led a military expedition into what is now the southeastern United States in the 1540s, he encountered Native American groups including the Tula people, who lived near the Arkansas River. de Soto's forces also encountered numerous Caddo villages. Composed of many tribes, the Caddo were organized into three confederacies, the Hasinai, Kadohadacho, and Natchitoches, which were all linked by similar languages.

At the time of de Soto's conquest, the Caddoan peoples occupied a large territory. It included what now is eastern Oklahoma, western Arkansas, northeastern Texas, and northwestern Louisiana. Anthropologists have thought that the Caddo and related peoples had been living in the region for centuries and that they had their own local variant of Mississippian culture.

Recent excavations have revealed more cultural diversity than scholars had expected within that region. The sites along the Arkansas River, in particular, seem to have their own distinctive characteristics. Scholars still classify the Mississippian sites found in the entire Caddo area, including Spiro Mounds, as "Caddoan Mississippian".

The Caddoan Mississippian region contained many towns in addition to Spiro, including the Battle Mound Site. Scholars have determined that Battle Mound, lying along the Great Bend of the Red River in southwest Arkansas, was a larger site than Spiro. Little excavation has been conducted there to date. The Caddoan Mississippian towns had a more irregular layout of earthen mounds and associated villages than did towns in the Middle Mississippian heartland to the east. They also lacked the wooden palisade fortifications often found in the major Middle Mississippian towns. Living on the western edge of the Mississippian world, the Caddoan may have faced fewer military threats from their neighbors. Also, their societies may have had a somewhat lower level of social stratification.

The Spiro people probably were speakers of one of the many Caddoan languages. The Caddoan languages once had a broad geographic distribution, but many are now extinct. The modern languages in the Caddoan family include Caddo, Wichita, Kitsai, Pawnee, and Arikara languages. Wichita and Kitsai are both extinct.

== Museum complex ==
The Spiro Mounds are located within the Spiro Mounds Archaeological Center complex in Fort Coffee, Oklahoma, and are directed by the Oklahoma Tourism and Recreation Department. The center features various exhibits and trails, and it offers tours, including a virtual tour.

== See also ==
- Mississippian copper plates
- List of Mississippian sites
