= Duck River cache =

Archeological collection of Mississipian artifacts

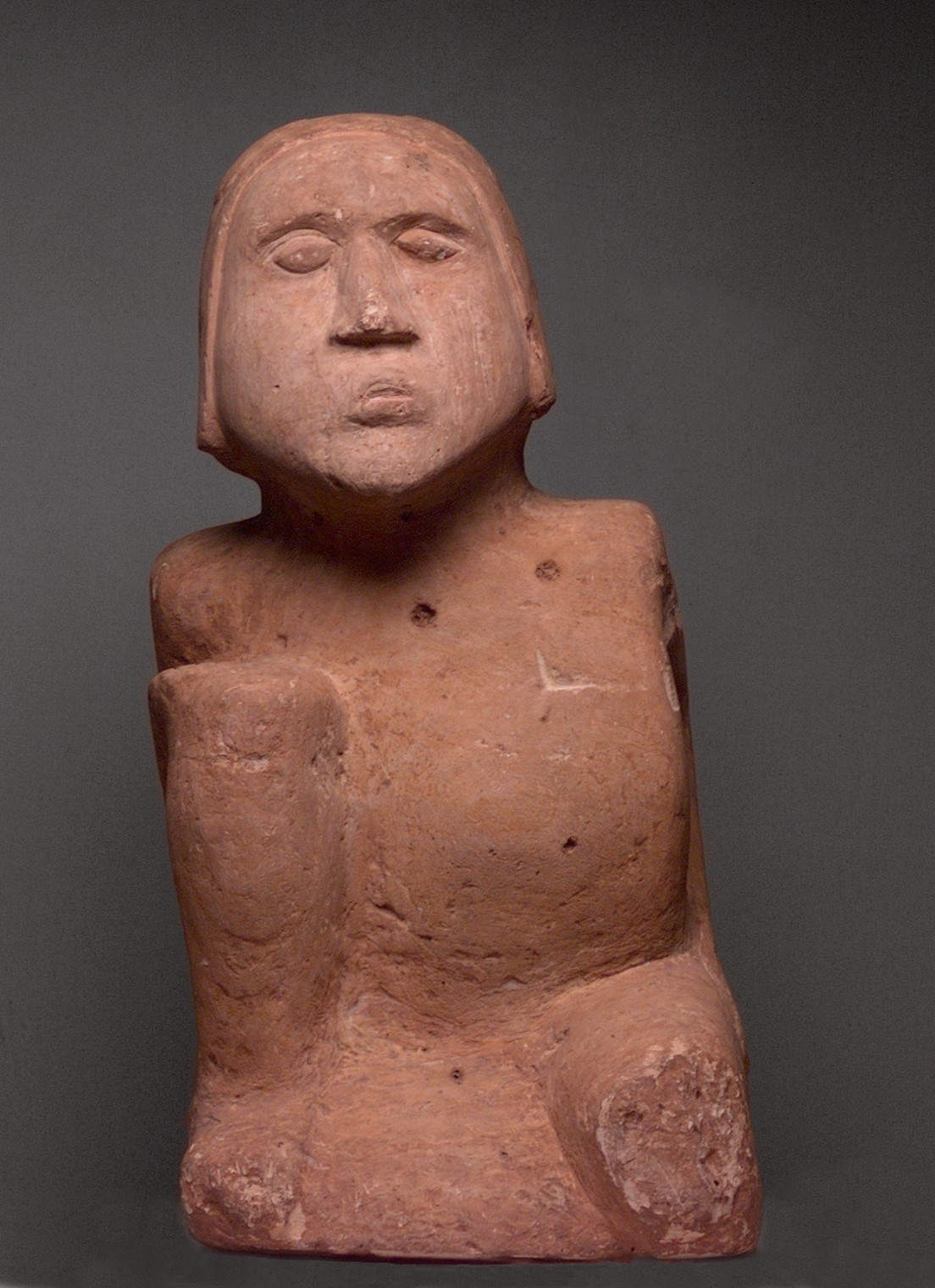
Front view of male "Adam" statue

The Duck River cache is the archaeological collection of 46 Mississippian culture artifacts discovered by a worker on at the Link Farm site in Middle Tennessee in December 1894.

== Chert objects ==
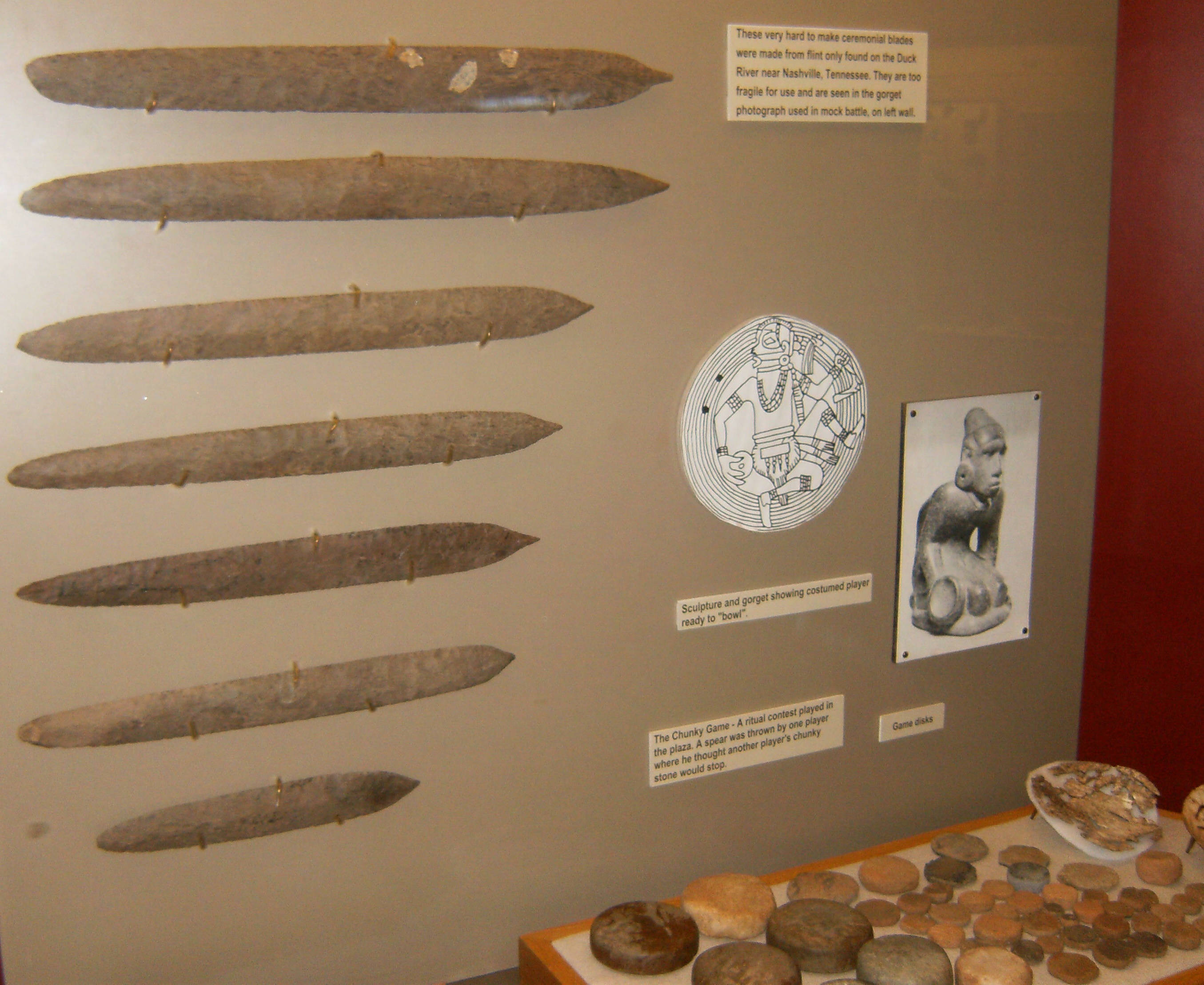
Dover chert "swords" similar to objects in the Duck River cache, found at the Etowah Mounds site in Georgia

The cache has been called "perhaps the most spectacular single collection of prehistoric Native American art ever discovered in the eastern United States". "Nearly four dozen ceremonial stone knives, daggers, swords, maces, and other striking examples of prehistoric stonework". The ceremonial objects are made from Dover chert, a type of flint found exclusively in the nearby Dover, Tennessee area.

== Stone statues ==
A few months later in March 1895 the same but slightly deeper location was also the site of the discovery of a paired male and female set of Mississippian sandstone statues nicknamed "Adam" and "Eve". The male statue is now at the Metropolitan Museum of Art and the female statue has been lost. The site is preserved as part of the Johnsonville State Historic Park.

== See also ==
- Mississippian copper plates
- Mississippian culture pottery
- Mound Bottom
- Obion Mounds
