= Cahokia polity =

Former indigenous American political entity

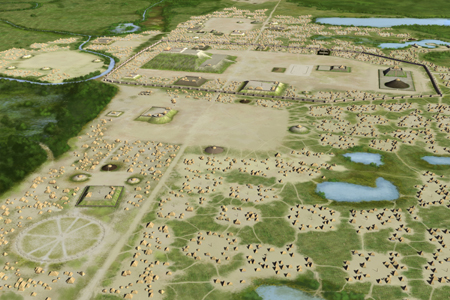
Artist's recreation of central Cahokia. Cahokia's east-west baseline transects the Woodhenge, Monks Mound, and several other large mounds.

The Cahokia polity was a political entity that existed with Cahokia as its center and exercising control over outlying areas. Unlike other Mississippian chiefdoms, the Cahokia polity had an unusual early emergence, high population, and noted greater regional influence. The majority opinion that a Cahokia chiefdom or a proto-state existed is because certain indicators of a state are not apparent in Cahokia's ruins. Despite Cahokia's large size, certain determining technological and political advances indicating a typical state have not been found in studies of Cahokia.

The term Ramey state was coined by scholars Conrad and Harn in 1972 to refer to a theorized state controlled by the capital city of Cahokia, believed to hold influence in all places where ancient Ramey pottery has been found. Scholars who hold that the Ramey state existed purport it held territorial control of the American Bottom, and had its capital at the ancient city of Cahokia. According to the theory, the state's economy was derived from mostly agricultural labor, with unskilled workers building large ceremonial structures for a small elite. A class of traders existed as well as a tribute system.

== Structure ==
Archeologists who point to an existence of a state at Cahokia use the evidence of urban planning and vast Cahokian trade influence as evidence that Cahokia must have been the center of a state.

Various models of how the theorized Ramey state functioned exist. Most of the models differ due to different interpretations of existing archaeological finds. One model believes Cahokia was the center of a trade and tribute system with a territory of farmers that consistently fed the city. This territory spanned much of the American Midwest. Evidence of an elite with political power and a legitimate use of force comes from evidence of massive human sacrifices at Cahokia.

Another model is that Cahokia was the center of a theatre state where important religious rituals performed at Cahokia wielded influence over the state's common people.

== In popular culture ==
Cahokia features prominently in author Alan Smale's Clash of Eagles series of alternate history novels; in which the Roman Empire attempts to conquer the city, as Smale imagines it, in the early 13th century CE.

== See also ==
- Mississippian culture
- Southeastern Ceremonial Complex
