= Caddoan Mississippian culture =

Indigenous civilization in present-day Southern Plains

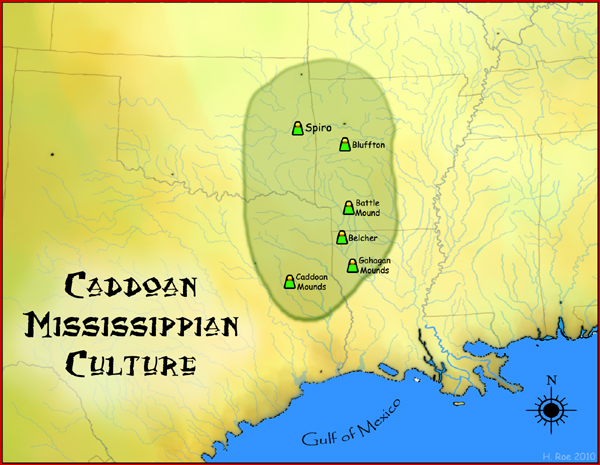
Map of the Caddoan Mississippian culture and some important sites

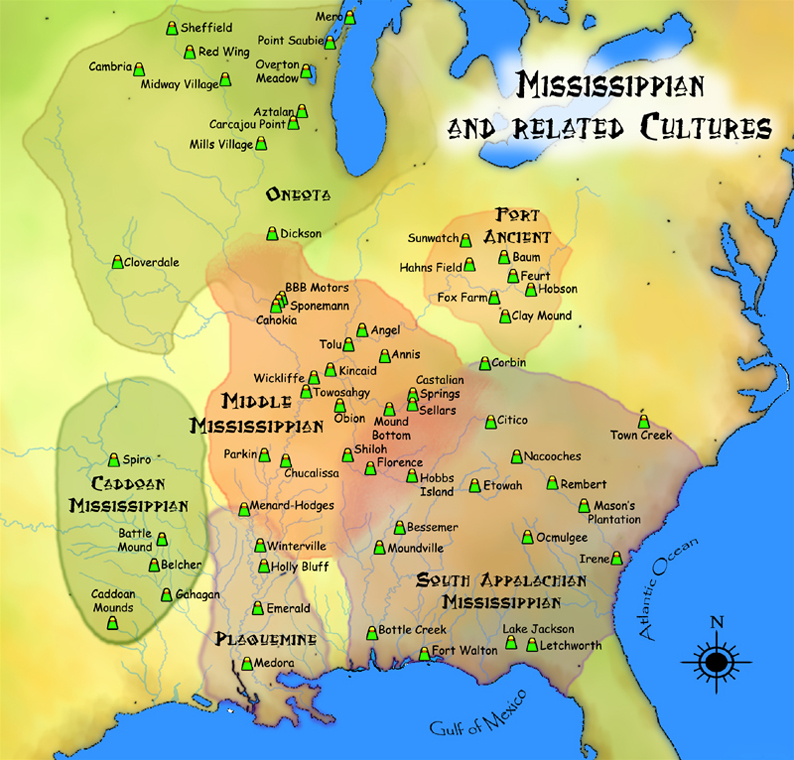
A map showing approximate areas of various Mississippian and related cultures. Cahokia is located near the center of this map in the upper part of the Middle Mississippi area.

The Caddoan Mississippian culture was a prehistoric Native American culture considered by archaeologists as a variant of the Mississippian culture. The Caddoan Mississippians covered a large territory, including what is now Eastern Oklahoma, Western Arkansas, Northeast Texas, Southwest Missouri and Northwest Louisiana of the United States.

Archaeological evidence has established that the cultural continuity is unbroken from prehistory to the present. The speakers of Caddo and related Caddoan languages in prehistoric times and at first European contact have been proved to be the direct ancestors of the modern Caddo Nation of Oklahoma.

== Description ==
=== Development ===
The Caddoan Mississippians are thought to be descendants of Woodland period groups, the Fourche Maline culture and Mossy Grove culture peoples who were living in the area around 200 BCE to 800 CE. They were linked to other peoples across much of the Eastern Woodlands through expansive trade networks. During this time period, pottery making was introduced to them by peoples to their East, and by 500 CE the bow and arrow from peoples of the Southwest.

By 800 CE early Caddoan society began to coalesce into one of the earlier Mississippian cultures. Some villages began to gain prominence as ritual centers. Workers were organized to build earthwork platform mounds, often used for temples, in addition to building elite residences and constructions. The mounds were arranged around large, constructed, open and level plazas. These were usually kept swept clean and were often used for ceremonial occasions involving large groups of people. As complex religious and social ideas developed, some people and family lineages gained prominence over others. This hierarchical structure is marked in the archaeological record by the appearance of large tombs with exotic grave offerings of obvious symbols of authority and prestige.

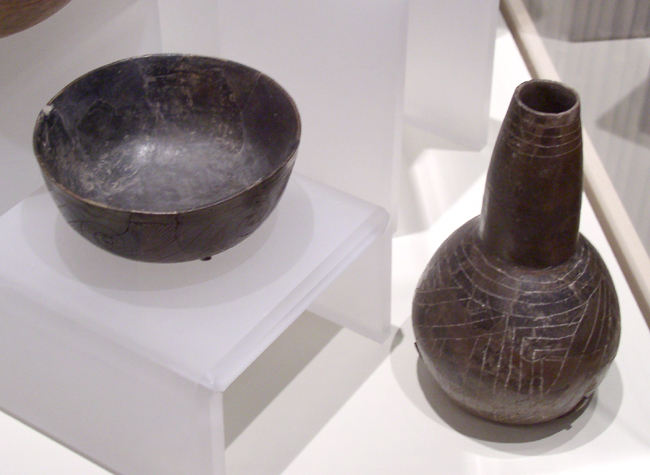
Caddoan Mississippian culture pottery

By 1000 CE a society now known as "Caddoan" had emerged. This included the increased prominence of ritual centers and the development of a more stratified social hierarchy, with some lineage and kin groups exerting more control over the community. The tomb burials of people thought to be leaders were accompanied by elaborate grave goods, as noted above. In addition, there were sacrificial "retainer" deaths and burials of both family members and followers at the death of such leaders.

Major sites such as Spiro and the Battle Mound Site were constructed in the Arkansas River Valley and the Red River Valley, respectively. As the largest and most fertile areas in the Caddoan region, these areas could support the most productive maize agriculture. Agricultural surpluses supported the growth of the dense populations of such major centers. By 1200 CE, the numerous villages, hamlets, and farmsteads established throughout the Caddo world had begun extensive maize agriculture. The Caddoans also developed a distinct type of pottery making. It was described in 1540 by members of the Hernando de Soto expedition as some of the finest they had seen, even in their homeland of Spain.

Since the late 20th century, recent excavations have revealed more cultural diversity within the region than had been expected by scholars, particularly in sites along the Arkansas River. Caddoan Mississippian towns had a more irregular layout of earthen mounds and associated villages than did towns in the Middle Mississippian heartland to the East, along the Ohio and Mississippi rivers. They also lacked the wooden palisade defensive fortifications often found in the major Middle Mississippian towns.

Living on the western edge of the Mississippian world, the Caddoans may have faced fewer military threats from other peoples. Their societies may also have had a somewhat lower level of social stratification. Their location at the western edge of the Eastern Woodlands may account for these differences. Because the climate west of the woodlands was drier, it hindered maize production and related populations. The lower population on the plains to the West may have meant the Caddoans did not have to compete with many neighboring chiefdoms.

But Caddoan populations peaked around 1400 CE, for reasons that are still unclear. After this point, many ritual centers begin to decline in population. A more dispersed settlement system developed, with the bulk of the people living on scattered homesteads and small farms rather than in large villages. The earlier broad cultural unity of the area also began to break down, with many distinct local variations developing.

=== Trade ===
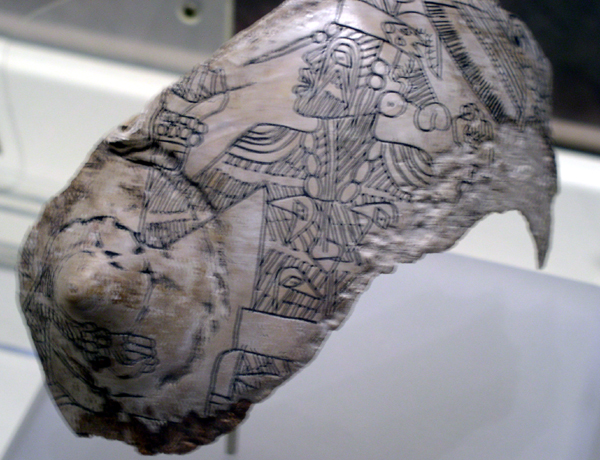
Engraved whelk shell from the Craig Mound showing a tattooed figure

Caddoan Mississippian peoples were connected to the larger Mississippian world to the East and other cultures to the Southwest by trade networks that spanned the North American continent. Artifacts found in "The Great Mortuary" (Craig Mound) at the Spiro site included colored flint from New Mexico, copper from the Great Lakes area, conch (or lightning whelk) shells from the Gulf Coast, and mica from the Carolinas. Other materials from trade included wood, basketry, woven fabric, lace, fur, feathers, and carved stone statues. Some artifacts came from as far away as Cahokia in present-day Illinois, Etowah and Ocmulgee in Georgia, and Moundville in Alabama. Many featured the elaborate symbolism of the Southeastern Ceremonial Complex, a multiregional and pan-linguistic trade and religious network.

Archaeological finds, as well as later Spanish records, also indicate that Caddoan peoples had contact with southwestern groups such as the Jumanos and Puebloans, with whom they traded for turquoise and cotton fabrics.

The Spiro site is the only Mississippian site where an artifact from Mesoamerica has been found. This is a piece of black obsidian from Mexico, which likely reached this site through Caddoan Mississippian trade with peoples to the Southwest. Using these valued materials, Mississippian artists created exquisite works of art expressing their cultural identity and their complex spiritual beliefs.

=== Language ===
The Caddoan Mississippians were speakers of many Caddoan languages. The Caddoan languages once had a broad geographic distribution, but many are now extinct. The modern languages in the Caddoan family include Caddo and Pawnee, which were spoken by historic tribes of the area. Both are now spoken mainly by tribal elders.

=== Sites ===
Site	Image	Description
Battle Mound Site	Battle Mound	Located in Lafayette County, Arkansas in the Great Bend region of the Red River basin and has the largest mound of the Caddoan Mississippian culture
Belcher Mound Site		Located in Caddo Parish, Louisiana in the Red River Valley 20 miles north of Shreveport and about one-half mile east of the town of Belcher, Louisiana
Bluffton Mound Site		Located in Yell County, Arkansas on the Fourche La Fave River.
Caddo Mounds State Historic Site	Caddoan Mounds	Also known as the George C. Davis Site (41CE19), located in Cherokee County, Texas 26 miles west of Nacogdoches, in the Piney Woods region of east Texas. Texas State Highway 21 passes nearby and intersects with U.S. Route 69.
Gahagan Mounds Site		Located in Red River Parish, Louisiana in the Red River Valley
Spiro Mounds	Spiro Mounds	One of the best-studied archaeological centers of Mississippian culture; located in Eastern Oklahoma in Le Flore County near the modern town of Spiro
Crenshaw Mounds		Multiple mound site in Miller County, Arkansas
Nakuukuwidish		Saltmaking site near DeQueen, Sevier County, Arkansas
Hardman		Saltmaking site near Arkadelphia, Clark County, Arkansas
Lockesburg Mounds		Major mound site in the Little River Region, east of DeQueen, Sevier County, Arkansas
Hatchel Mound		Former mound site in Bowie County, Texas, believed to be the mound referenced in the Teran Map
Mineral Springs		Mound group near Mineral Springs, Howard County, Arkansas

== European contact and relations with United States ==
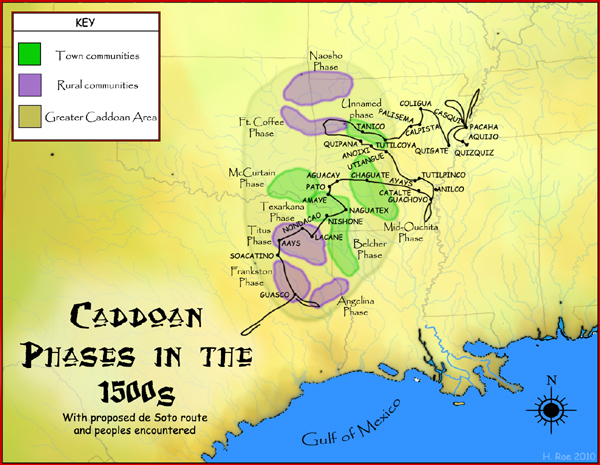
de Soto route through the Caddo area, with known archaeological phases marked

When the Spanish conquistador Hernando de Soto led an expedition into the southeastern region of North America in the 1540s, his party encountered Native American groups recorded as the Naguatex, Nishone, Hacanac, and Nondacao. These names are now believed to have referred to Caddo villages.

It is estimated that in 1520, the many tribes of people numbered about 250,000. Over the next 250 years the population of these Caddoan-speaking peoples was severely reduced by epidemics of infectious diseases inadvertently brought by Spanish and French colonists and spread by indigenous trading networks. Sometime after the coming of the Europeans, the Caddo organized into three confederacies—the Natchitoches, Hasinai, and the Kadohadacho. All Caddoans were linked together by a common language.

In the early 19th century, under the Indian Removal Act the United States forced the Caddo to cede their lands and move to Indian Territory. European Americans were eager to settle in the fertile river valleys of their territory. Later they were required to accept allotment of their communal lands, prior to the admission of Oklahoma as a state in 1907.

=== Caddo today ===
The Caddo Nation of Oklahoma (previously known as the Caddo Tribe of Oklahoma) reorganized and set up a constitutional government in the 20th century and is a federally recognized tribe. A tribal constitution provides for an elected tribal council of eight members with a chairperson. The tribe is based in Binger, Oklahoma. The tribal complex, dance grounds, and the Caddo Heritage Museum are located south of Binger.

In 2008, a total of 5000 people were enrolled in the tribe, and 2500 of these live in the state of Oklahoma. The tribe operates its own housing authority and issues its own tribal vehicle tags. They maintain administrative centers, dance grounds, several community centers, and an active NAGPRA office.

The Caddo have established several programs to invigorate Caddo traditions. The tribe sponsors a summer culture camp for children. The Hasinai Society and Caddo Culture Club. Both keep Caddo songs and dances alive. The Kiwat Hasinay Foundation is dedicated to preserving the Caddo language.

== See also ==
- List of Mississippian sites
