= National Register of Historic Places listings in Oconto County, Wisconsin =

Location of Oconto County in Wisconsin

This is a list of the National Register of Historic Places listings in Oconto County, Wisconsin. It is intended to provide a comprehensive listing of entries in the National Register of Historic Places that are located in Oconto County, Wisconsin. The locations of National Register properties for which the latitude and longitude coordinates are included below may be seen on a map.

There are 26 properties and districts listed on the National Register in the county.

This National Park Service list is complete through NPS recent listings posted August 21, 2026.

== Current listings ==
	Name on the Register	Image	Date listed	Location	City or town	Description
1	Archibald Lake Mound Group	Archibald Lake Mound Group	April 4, 2012 (#12000182)	Address Restricted	Townsend	Large group of conical and linear mounds on a ridge overlooking Archibald Lake, probably built between 200 and 1500 AD.
2	Arndt's Pensaukee Sawmill Complex		March 22, 2006 (#06000205)	Address Restricted (North of Drolette Rd, 1 mile east of US 41 near Pensaukee)	Oconto	Wisconsin’s first water-powered sawmill and lumbering operation operated from 1827 until the 1860s. The only surviving structure is the dam levy on the Pensaukee River.
3	Beyer Home Museum	Beyer Home Museum	August 14, 1979 (#79000100)	917 Park Ave. 44°53′35″N 87°51′54″W	Oconto	Brick home built in 1868 in Italianate style by Cyrus and Kitty Hart. Remodelled around 1881 to Queen Anne by George Beyer, German immigrant, bookkeeper, and businessman. Now a museum.
4	Boulder Lake Site	Boulder Lake Site	February 19, 2002 (#02000073)	Address Restricted	Doty	Woodland period archaeological site.
5	John G. Campbell House	John G. Campbell House	January 15, 1980 (#80000171)	916 Park Ave. 44°53′36″N 87°51′52″W	Oconto	1892 Queen Anne-styled house built for Campbell, a timber cruiser and businessman.
6	Chute Pond Dam	Chute Pond Dam	May 17, 2010 (#10000269)	Chute Pond County Park WIS 32/WIS 64; 45°07′52″N 88°26′35″W	Mountain	The WPA built this concrete dam in 1937 to create a recreational flowage on the Oconto River, and to provide jobs. It is on the site of an earlier log dam.
7	Citizens State Bank of Gillett	Citizens State Bank of Gillett	December 4, 2008 (#08001159)	137 E. Main St. 44°53′26″N 88°18′19″W	Gillett	Neoclassical bank built in 1904 and lasting until 1932. Since then the building has housed a grocery store, a clothes store, a glove factory and now a dentist.
8	Farnsworth Public Library	Farnsworth Public Library	December 21, 2017 (#100001913)	715 Main St. 44°53′20″N 87°52′23″W	Oconto	Neoclassical library designed by Henry Foeller of Green Bay and built in 1903.
9	First Church of Christ, Scientist	First Church of Christ, Scientist	November 19, 1974 (#74000111)	Chicago and Main Sts. 44°53′24″N 87°52′39″W	Oconto	Carpenter Gothic-styled church built in 1886 - the first church built anywhere for the Church of Christ, Scientist.
10	Holt and Balcom Logging Camp No. 1	Holt and Balcom Logging Camp No. 1	December 22, 1978 (#78000121)	E of Lakewood; 45°17′54″N 88°29′44″W	Lakewood	Log building built in 1880, with cookhouse and bunkhouse - possibly the oldest logging camp in the U.S. standing on its original site. Now a museum.
11	Holt-Balcom Lumber Company Office	Holt-Balcom Lumber Company Office	November 13, 1976 (#76000069)	106 Superior Ave. 44°53′13″N 87°52′08″W	Oconto	Sawmill and lumber company office with elements of Greek Revival style, built in 1854.
12	Huff Jones House	Huff Jones House	December 22, 1978 (#78000122)	1345 Main St; 44°53′14″N 87°51′46″W	Oconto	Possibly the oldest remaining home in Oconto, built in 1851 in Greek Revival style. Jones and his sons built the first stream sawmill on the Oconto River.
13	Daniel E. Krause Stone Barn	Daniel E. Krause Stone Barn	July 14, 2000 (#00000810)	NE corner of Cty. Trunk Hwy S and Schwartz Rd. 44°43′06″N 88°10′43″W	Chase	Stone cobble barn built in 1903 - the only remaining barn of this style in the state.
14	Mathey Building	Mathey Building	February 18, 1999 (#99000242)	126 W. Main St. 44°57′04″N 88°02′52″W	Lena	Two-story grocery store built in 1906.
15	Mountain Fire Lookout Tower	Mountain Fire Lookout Tower	August 19, 2008 (#08000790)	Forest Service Rd. 2335 (Tower Rd.), Lakewood Ranger District, Nicolet National Forest; 45°12′49″N 88°27′52″W	Riverview	Galvanized steel fire tower fabricated by Aermotor Company, moved to this location by CCC in 1935. From this high point, spotters watched this part of the Nicolet National Forest at least until the last fire was reported here in 1970.
16	Mountain School	Mountain School	November 22, 2000 (#00001453)	14330 Hwy W West; 45°10′56″N 88°28′33″W	Mountain	Brick high school built in 1905. A.k.a. Union Free High School and Mountain Elementary School.
17	Oconto County Courthouse	Oconto County Courthouse	March 9, 1982 (#82000690)	300 Washington St. 44°53′22″N 87°51′58″W	Oconto	Elegant Romanesque Revival-styled courthouse with domed tower, built in 1891, damaged by fire in 1907, and added to since.
18	Oconto Main Post Office	Oconto Main Post Office	August 28, 1980 (#80004479)	141 Congress St. 44°53′18″N 87°52′05″W	Oconto	Brick building designed by James Wetmore in Georgian Revival style and built in 1922.
19	Oconto Site	Oconto Site	October 15, 1966 (#66000023)	Copper Culture State Park; 44°53′12″N 87°54′03″W	Oconto	Burial site of at least 45 ancient Native Americans from 3000 to 4000 BC. Finds at this site helped archaeologists date the copper tools found in other places and identify a trade network that stretched from the Rockies to the Gulf coast.
20	St. Mark's Episcopal Church, Guild Hall and Vicarage	St. Mark's Episcopal Church, Guild Hall and Vicarage	August 1, 1985 (#85001684)	408 Park Ave. 44°53′18″N 87°51′51″W	Oconto	The 1866 Greek Revival Guild Hall (a.k.a. 1866-1867 Methodist Church) now houses a local theater troupe. The 1866 (or 1871?) vicarage is now styled Queen Anne. The Neo-Gothic church was demolished in 1998.
21	St. Peter's and St. Joseph's Catholic Churches	St. Peter's and St. Joseph's Catholic Churches	November 10, 1980 (#80000172)	516 Brazeau Ave. and 705 Park Ave. 44°53′29″N 87°51′54″W	Oconto	St. Joseph's started as a frame building in 1870 and has developed into a Victorian Gothic church. St. Peter's was built in 1899 in the Romanesque Revival style.
22	Gov. Edward Scofield House	Gov. Edward Scofield House	April 11, 1973 (#73000090)	610 Main St. 44°53′20″N 87°52′25″W	Oconto	Italianate house built in 1868 by lumberman William Brunquest. Later the home of Wisconsin's 19th governor, where he died. Also called the Tellez house.
23	Smyth Road Bridge	Smyth Road Bridge	September 12, 1996 (#96001018)	Smyth Rd. over North Branch of the Oconto River; 45°18′54″N 88°24′54″W	Lakewood	Metal Pratt Truss bridge built in 1928.
24	Weber Lake Picnic Ground Shelter		May 21, 1996 (#96000541)	Jct. of WI 32 and NFS 2308; 45°09′37″N 88°26′58″W	Mountain	Rustic-style log picnic shelter built by the CCCs in 1937. A.k.a. Green Lake Picnic Ground Shelter.
25	West Main Street Historic District	West Main Street Historic District	May 14, 1979 (#79000101)	Main St. from Duncan to Erie Sts. 44°53′23″N 87°52′30″W	Oconto	Residential district with 20 homes in various styles, ranging from the 1857 Smith house to the 1878 Second Empire Hall house to the 1914 O'Kelliher bungalow to the 1929 Spanish Colonial Revival Bond house.
26	White Potato Lake Garden Beds Site		June 1, 2005 (#05000532)	White Potato Lake Road; 45°07′54″N 88°13′02″W	Brazeau	Intact raised garden plots in a geometric pattern, built by Native Americans from 1000 to 1650 AD.

== See also ==
- List of National Historic Landmarks in Wisconsin
- National Register of Historic Places listings in Wisconsin
- Listings in neighboring counties: Brown, Forest, Langlade, Marinette, Menominee, Shawano
