= Copper Culture State Park =

State Park in Oconto County, Wisconsin, US

- Oconto Site
- U.S. National Register of Historic Places
- U.S. National Historic Landmark
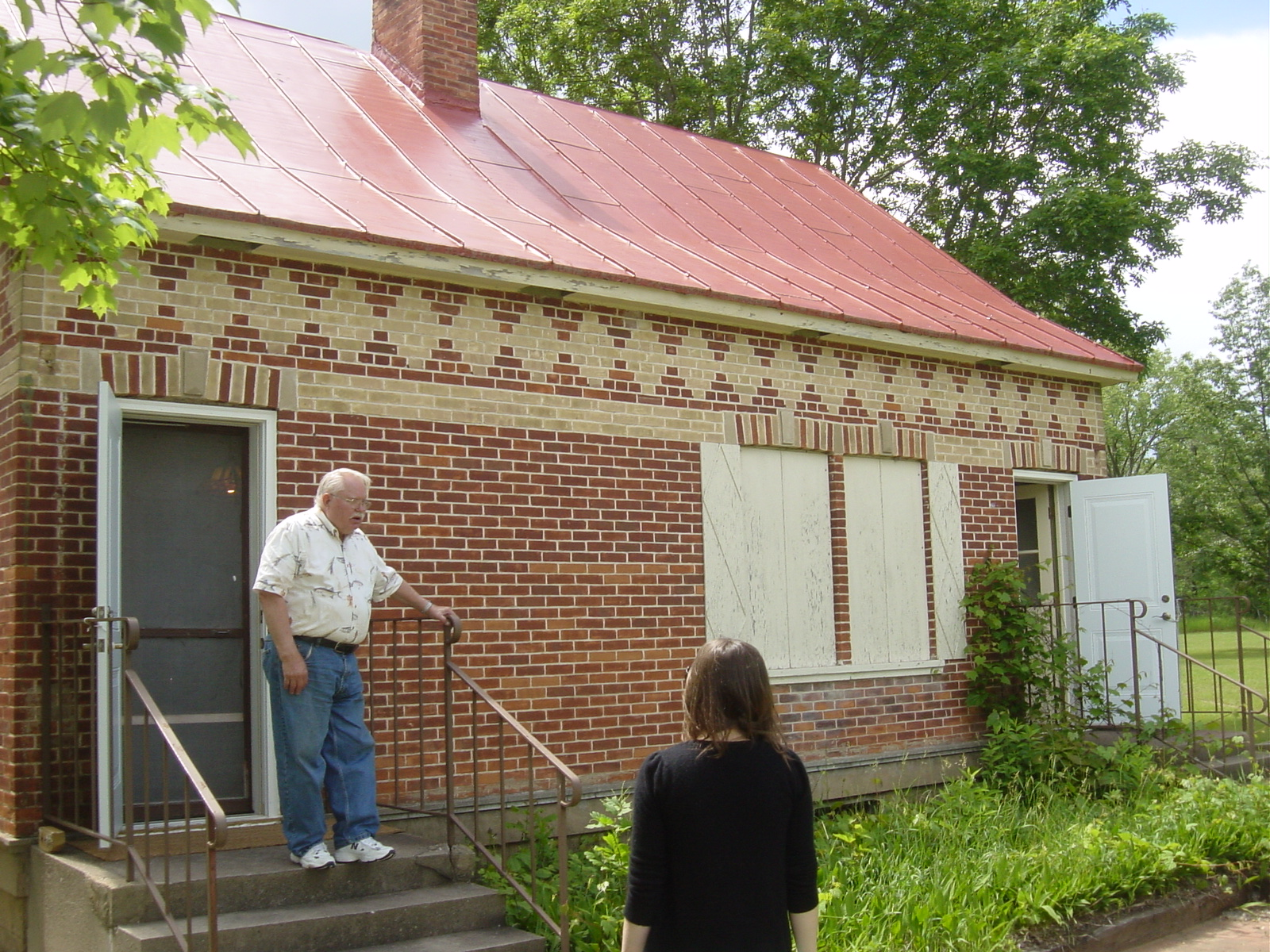
- Farmstead at Copper Culture State Park

- Location within Wisconsin Location within the United States
- Location: Oconto, Wisconsin
- Coordinates: 44°53′12″N 87°54′3″W
- NRHP reference No.: 66000023

Significant dates
- Added to NRHP: October 15, 1966
- Designated NHL: January 20, 1961

Copper Culture State Park is a 42-acre (17 ha) Wisconsin state park in Oconto, northeastern Wisconsin, United States. The park has natural areas, farmlands, archaeological sites, and a Native American museum.

== History ==
Plans for the park go back to 1959. However, it was not opened until 1976.

== Features ==
=== Archaeological site ===
The park contains an ancient burial ground used by the Old Copper Complex Culture of early Native Americans, between around 4,000 and 2,000 BCE. It was rediscovered in June 1952 by a 13-year-old boy who unearthed human bones while playing in an old quarry. By July the first archaeological dig had commenced, as part of the program of the Wisconsin Archaeological Survey.

==== Artifacts ====
Utilitarian products were much more numerous than ornamental items in the grave goods found, and the ancient artifacts were created from various materials.

- Copper: awls, crescents, clasps; and a spear-point, fishhook, bracelet, spirally-coiled tubing, rivet, and a spatula.
- Chipped stone: scraper, projectile points.
- Bone: awl (fish jawbone), and a "fine specimen of a whistle" (leg bone of a swan).
- Antler: possible flaking tools.
- Shell: pond snail (Campeloma decisum) beads.

The ancient burial ground is a National Historic Landmark, on the National Register of Historic Places listings in Wisconsin, and protected within Copper Culture State Park.

=== Charles Werrebroeck Museum ===
The Oconto Archaic Copper Museum is located within the Charles Werrebroeck Museum—Belgium Home, a traditional Belgian style farmhouse built in 1924 by Charles Werrebroeck. Artifacts and photographs from excavations on the park's grounds are displayed in the museum.

=== Recreation ===
Other features in the 40-acre Copper Culture State Park include picnic tables, BBQ grills, restrooms, and a community pavilion.

Natural history

Nature trails explore various natural habitats in the park.

- Laurentian Mixed Forest woodlands
- Riparian zone of the Oconto River, and fishing in it.
- Short-grass prairie

== Access ==
Copper Culture State Park is managed by the Oconto County Historical Society, a non-profit organization, rather than the Wisconsin Department of Natural Resources, therefore admission is free. Visitors do not require a Wisconsin state park pass to enter, but are encouraged to make a donation at the museum.

The Charles Werrebroeck Museum, with the Oconto Archaic Copper Museum, is open in the summer daily from Memorial Day to Labor Day from 10am to 4pm, or by appointment. Free admission and guided tours are available.

== See also ==
- Native American archeological sites on the National Register of Historic Places listings in Oconto County, Wisconsin'
  - Archibald Lake Mound Group — near Townsend.
  - Boulder Lake Site — near Doty
  - White Potato Lake Garden Beds Site — near Brazeau
- Great Lakes tribal culture
