= White Potato Lake Garden Beds Site =

- U.S. National Register of Historic Places
- Location: Brazeau, Wisconsin
- NRHP reference No.: 05000532
- Added to NRHP: June 1, 2005

The White Potato Lake Garden Beds Site, a Native American archaeological site, is located in Brazeau, northeastern Wisconsin. The location was added to the National Register of Historic Places in Wisconsin in 2005. The site lies near White Potato Lake.

== History ==
The site is believed to have been used by Native Americans for farming from around 1000 to 1650 CE. It is visited by archaeologists to study indigenous horticultural and agricultural practices.

== See also ==
- Old Copper Complex
- National Register of Historic Places listings in Oconto County, Wisconsin
