= John Verkuilen =

American politician

John Verkuilen (September 3, 1867 – January 24, 1936) was an American farmer and politician.

Born in the town of Pensaukee, Oconto County, Wisconsin, Verkuilen worked in the shipyard in Sheboygan, Wisconsin. In 1894, Verkuilen, his wife, and family moved to the town of Worden, Clark County, Wisconsin and started a farm. Verkuilen served on the Worden Town Board, the Pioneer School Board, and on the Clark County Board of Supervisors. In 1921, Verkuilen served in the Wisconsin State Assembly as a Republican. In 1927, Verkuilen and his wife moved to Thorp, Wisconsin. Verkuilen died in a hospital in Chippewa Falls, Wisconsin.
