= Worden, Wisconsin =

- Town
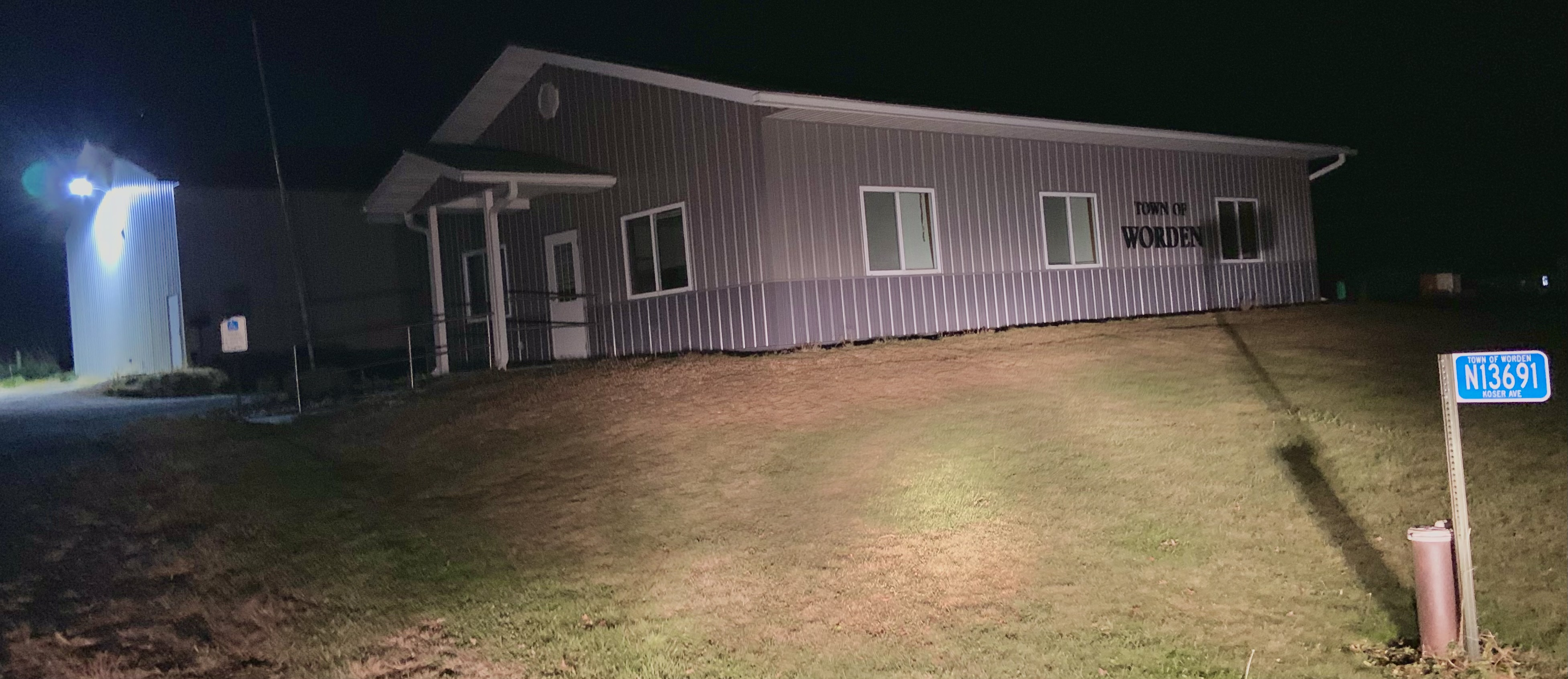
- Town hall

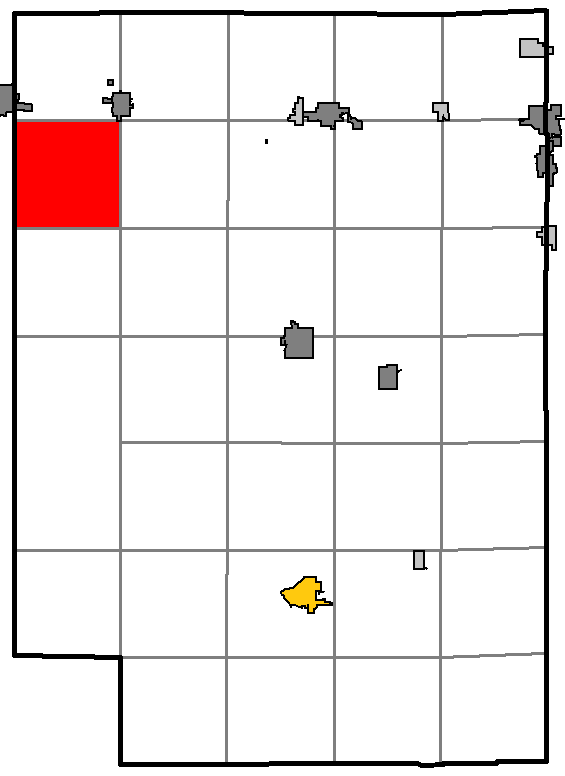
- Location of Worden, Clark County

- Location of Clark County, Wisconsin
- Coordinates: 44°54′42″N 90°51′58″W
- Country: United States
- State: Wisconsin
- County: Clark

Area
  - Total: 36.1 sq mi (93.6 km^{2})
  - Land: 36.1 sq mi (93.6 km^{2})
  - Water: 0 sq mi (0.0 km^{2})
- Elevation: 1,060 ft (323 m)

Population (2020)
  - Total: 708
  - Density: 19.6/sq mi (7.56/km^{2})
- Time zone: UTC-6 (Central (CST))
  - Summer (DST): UTC-5 (CDT)
- Area codes: 715 & 534
- FIPS code: 55-89125
- GNIS feature ID: 1584483

Worden is a town in Clark County in the U.S. state of Wisconsin. The population was 708 at the 2020 census.

== Geography ==
According to the United States Census Bureau, the town has a total area of 36.1 square miles (93.6 km^{2}), all of it land.

== Demographics ==
As of the census of 2000, there were 657 people, 198 households, and 167 families residing in the town. The population density was 18.2 people per square mile (7.0/km^{2}). There were 210 housing units at an average density of 5.8 per square mile (2.2/km^{2}). The racial makeup of the town was 98.63% White, 0.15% African American, 0.76% from other races, and 0.46% from two or more races. Hispanic or Latino of any race were 0.76% of the population.

There were 198 households, out of which 47.5% had children under the age of 18 living with them, 70.2% were married couples living together, 6.6% had a female householder with no husband present, and 15.2% were non-families. 12.6% of all households were made up of individuals, and 4.0% had someone living alone who was 65 years of age or older. The average household size was 3.32 and the average family size was 3.62.

In the town, the population was spread out, with 36.8% under the age of 18, 8.2% from 18 to 24, 28.0% from 25 to 44, 18.0% from 45 to 64, and 9.0% who were 65 years of age or older. The median age was 29 years. For every 100 females, there were 106.6 males. For every 100 females age 18 and over, there were 116.1 males.

The median income for a household in the town was $37,321, and the median income for a family was $37,361. Males had a median income of $21,875 versus $18,906 for females. The per capita income for the town was $12,381. About 12.1% of families and 14.6% of the population were below the poverty line, including 19.7% of those under age 18 and 7.5% of those age 65 or over.

== Notable people ==
- John Verkuilen, Wisconsin State Representative and farmer, lived on a farm in the town
