= Metallurgy in pre-Columbian America =

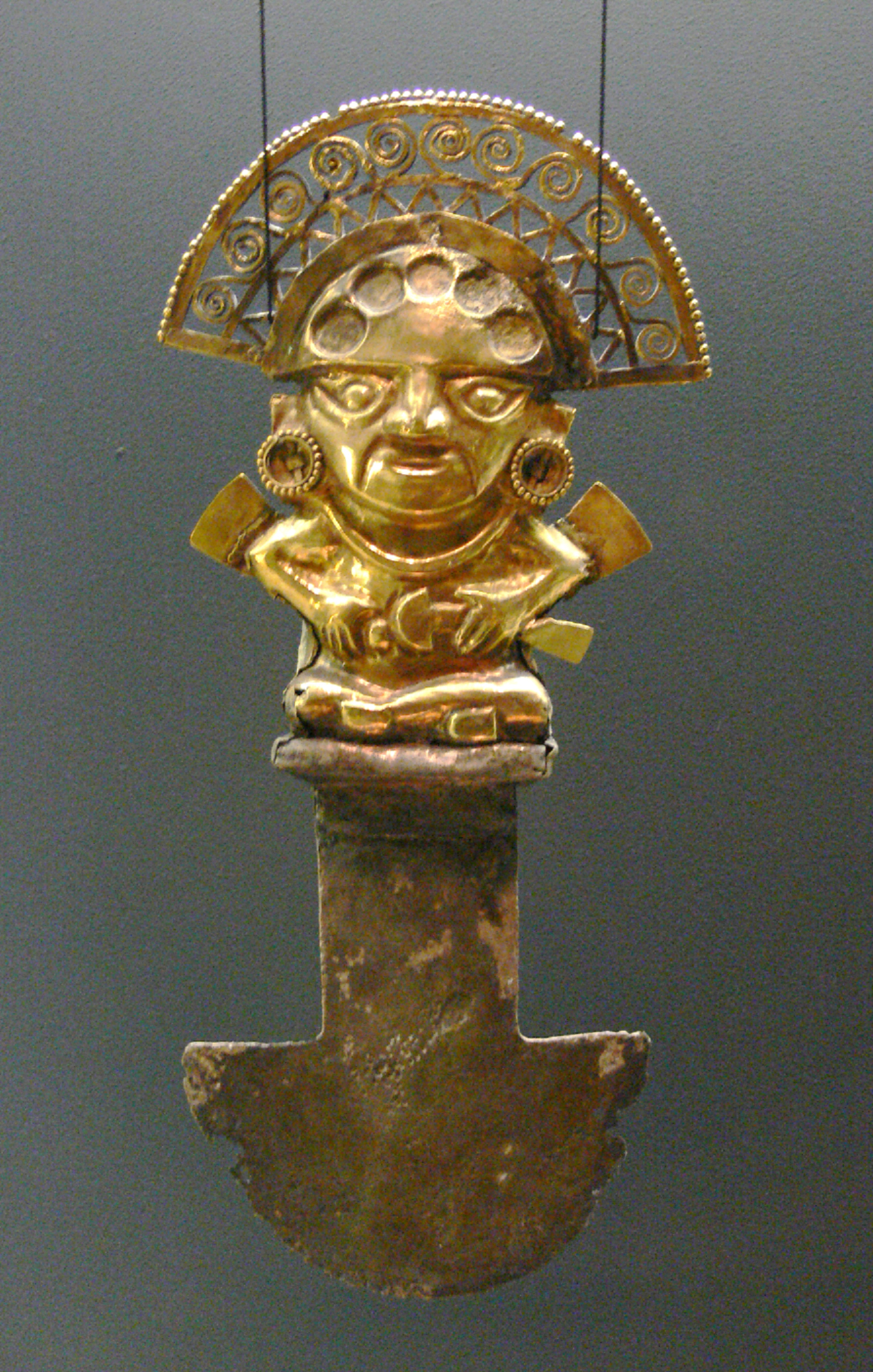
Sican tumi, or ceremonial knife, Peru, 850–1500 CE

Metallurgy in pre-Columbian America is the extraction, purification and alloying of metals and metal crafting by Indigenous peoples of the Americas prior to European contact in the late 15th century. Indigenous Americans had been using native metals from ancient times, with gold artifacts from the Andean region being dated to 2155–1936 BC, and North American copper artifacts being dated to approximately 5000 BC. The metal would have been found in nature without the need for smelting, and shaped into the desired form using hot and cold hammering without significant chemical changes or alloy formation. As of 1999, "no one has found evidence that points to the use of melting, smelting and casting in prehistoric eastern North America."

In South America the case is quite different. Indigenous South Americans had full metallurgy with smelting and various metals being purposely alloyed. Metallurgy in Mesoamerica and western Mexico may have developed following contact with South America through Ecuadorian marine traders.

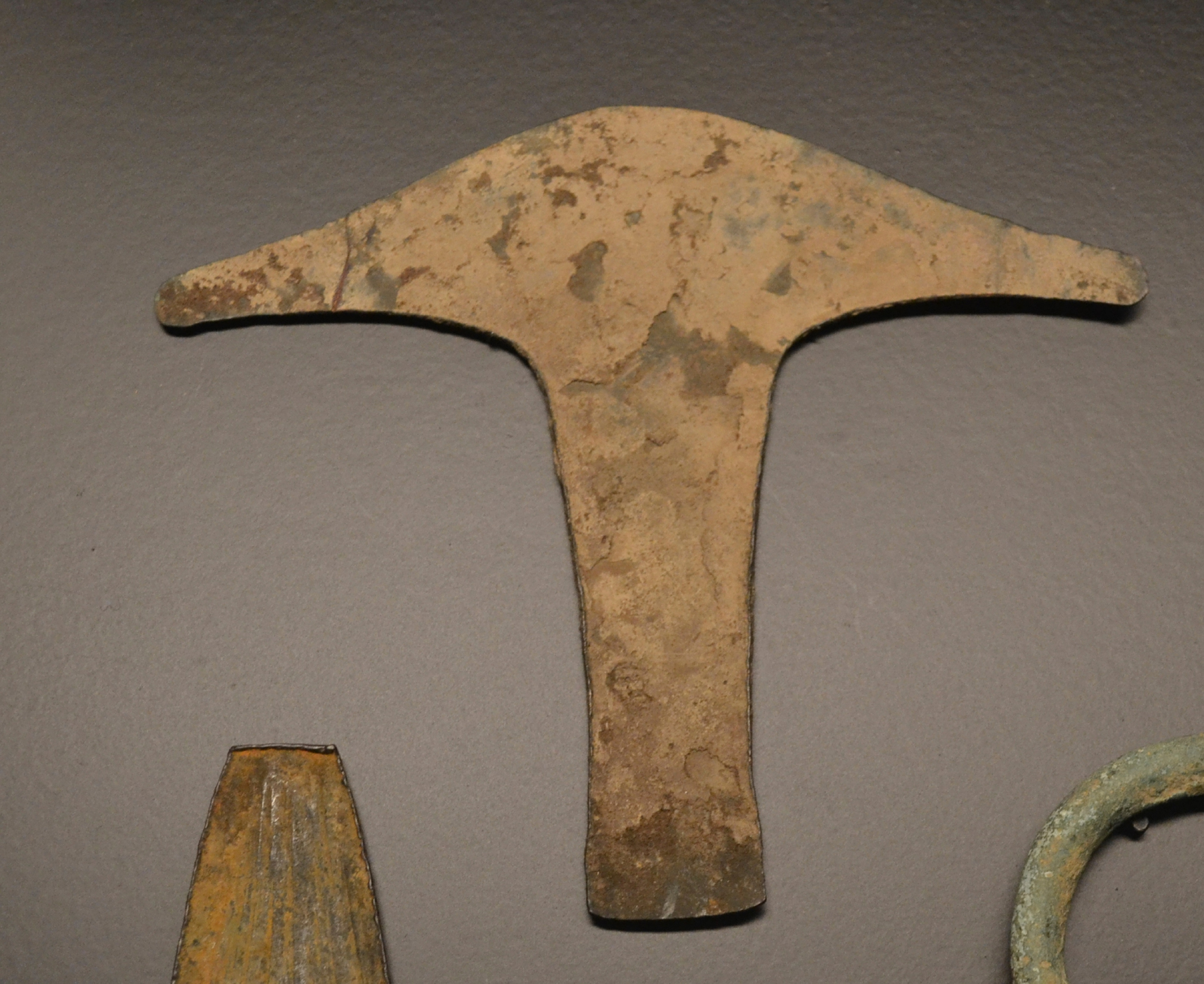
Bronze axe-money from Mexico at the Prehistory Museum of Valencia

== South America ==
South American metal working seems to have developed in the Andean region of modern Peru, Bolivia, Ecuador, Chile, and Argentina with gold and copper being hammered and shaped into intricate objects, particularly ornaments. Recent finds date the earliest gold work to 2155–1936 BC. and the earliest copper work to 1432–1132 BC. Ice core studies in Bolivia suggest copper smelting may have begun as early as 700 BC, over 2700 years ago. By 1410–1090 BC, gilding was practiced in coastal Peru. Further evidence for this type of metal work comes from the sites at Waywaka (near Andahuaylas in southern Peru), Chavín and Kotosh, and it seems to have been spread throughout Andean societies by the Early horizon (1000–200 BC).

Unlike other metallurgy traditions where metals gained importance through practical use in weaponry and everyday utensils, metals in South America (and later Central America) were mainly valued as adornments and status objects. Though also functional objects were produced, even in the metallurgically advanced Andean cultures of the Inca era stone tools were never completely replaced by bronze items in everyday life. During the Early horizon, advances in metal working produced spectacular and characteristic Andean gold objects made by the joining of smaller metal sheets, and also gold-silver alloy appeared.

Two traditions seem to have developed alongside each other – one in northern Peru and Ecuador, and another in the Altiplano region of southern Peru, Bolivia and Chile. There is evidence for smelting of copper sulphide in the Altiplano region around the Early horizon. Evidence for this comes from copper slag recovered at several sites, with the ore itself possibly coming from the south Chilean-Bolivian border. Near Puma Punku, Bolivia, and at three additional sites in Peru and Bolivia, portable smelting kilns were used to cast I-shaped "cramps" (fasteners) in place, to join large stone blocks during construction. Their chemical analysis shows

95.15%	copper
2.05%	arsenic
1.70%	nickel
0.84%	silicon
0.26%	iron

The estimated date of these pours lies between 800 and 500 BC.

Evidence for fully developed smelting, however, only appears with the Moche culture (northern coast, 200 BC – 600 CE). The ores were extracted from shallow deposits in the Andean foothills. They were probably smelted nearby, as pictorially depicted on the metal artifacts themselves and on ceramic vessels. Smelting was done in adobe brick furnaces with at least three blow pipes to provide the air flow needed to reach the high temperatures. The resulting ingots would then have been moved to coastal centers for shaping in specialised workshops. Two workshops studied were near the administrative sections of their towns, again showing the prestige of metal. Analysis of a Moche statue composed of numerous thin metal layers revealed complex plating and gilding involving a combination of immersion in acidic solutions and the application of extreme heat.

The objects themselves were still mainly adornments, now often being attached to beads. In fact, in the Lambayeque and Chimu cultures (750–1400 CE), a wide range of functional metal items were produced such as bowls, plates, drinking vessels, boxes, models, scales and especially beakers (acquillas), but mostly for ceremonial or elite use. Some functional objects were fashioned, but they were elaborately decorated and often found in high-status burials, seemingly still used more for symbolic than for practical purposes. The appearance of gold or silver seems to have been important, with a high number of gilded or silvered objects as well as the appearance of Tumbaga, an alloy of copper and gold, and sometimes also silver. Arsenic bronze was also smelted from sulphidic ores, a practice either independently developed or learned from the southern tradition. The earliest known powder metallurgy, and earliest working of platinum in the world, was apparently developed by the cultures of Esmeraldas (northwest Ecuador) before the Spanish conquest Beginning with the La Tolita culture (600 BC – 200 CE), Ecuadorian cultures mastered the soldering of platinum grains through alloying with copper, gold and silver, producing platinum-surfaced rings, handles, ornaments and utensils. This technology was eventually noticed and adopted by the Spanish c. 1730.

Coastal communities in the Atacama Desert, as exemplified by those near Tocopilla, produced their own metal objects for practical use in the 900–1400 CE period.

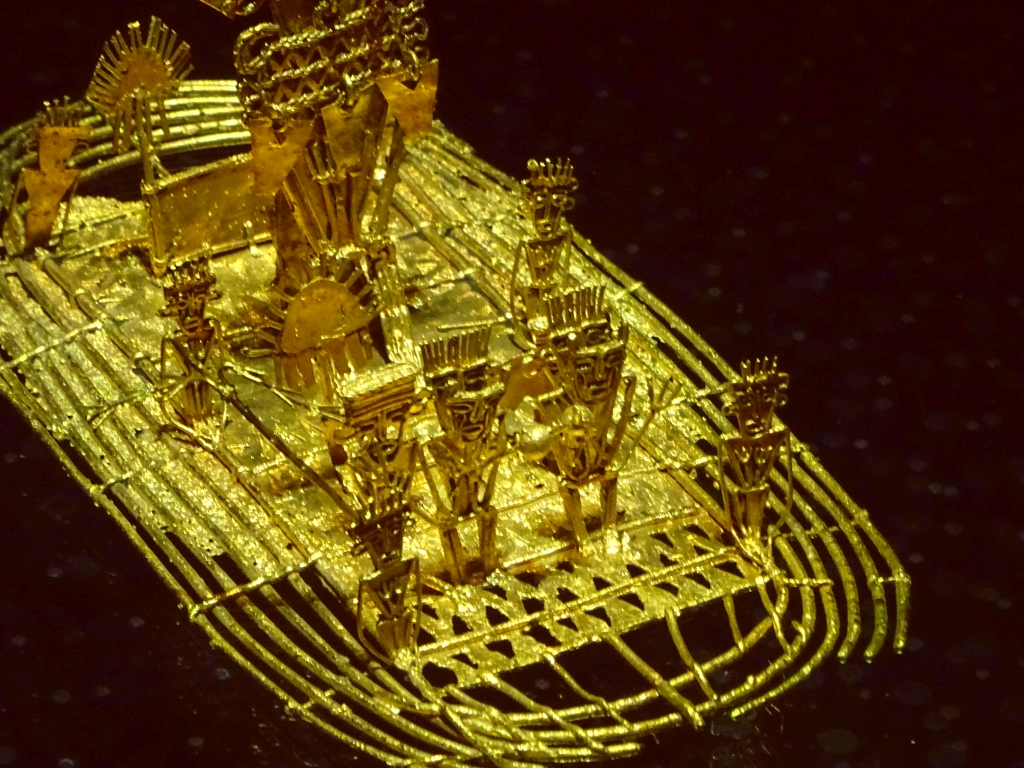
The gold Muisca raft in the Museo del Oro, Bogotá

Metallurgy gradually spread north into Colombia, Panama and Costa Rica, reaching Guatemala and Belize by 800 CE. By c. 100–700 CE, depletion gilding was developed by the Nahuange culture of Colombia to produce ornamental variations such as rose gold. Muisca goldworking, from modern Colombia, made a wide variety of small ornamental and religious objects from about 600 CE onwards. The gold Muisca raft is probably the best-known single object. This is in the Gold Museum, Bogotá, the largest of the six "gold museums" owned by the Central Bank of Colombia displaying gold from the Muisca and other pre-Columbian cultures in the country.

Many copper objects produced in the Tiwanaku polity (c. 600–c. 1000) are alloys that are characterized by having approximately 5% arsenic and 4% nickel.

=== Inca Empire ===
At Machu Picchu and other sites, metal was used for bolas, plumb bobs, chisels, gravers, pry bars, tweezers, needles, plates, fish hooks, spatulas, ladles, knives (tumi), bells, breastplates, lime spoons, mace heads, ear spools, bowls, cloak pins (tupus), axes, and foot plough adzes. Nonetheless, they remained materials through which to display wealth and status. The characteristic importance placed on colour, which had led to some of the earlier developments, was still present (sun/moon association with gold/silver). Metals other than gold also had an intrinsic value, with axe pieces being of particular note in this regard. With the spread of metal tools by the Incas, it is thought possible that a more Old World use of metals would have become more common. In any case, as Bruhns notes, "[b]ronze can be seen as an expensive substitute for the equally efficient stone". However, sediment research in Bolivia has revealed that metals such as silver were smelted on a very large scale, thousands of tons, from late Tiwanaku to Inca times (1000–1530 CE), which suggests that the paucity of metal (particularly precious metal) at Inca sites is more likely caused by Spanish acquisition and export than by limited pre-colonial use.

It has been claimed that the Inca Empire expanded into Diaguita lands in what is now north-central Chile because of its mineral wealth, but that view is rejected by some scholars. Furthermore, an additional possibility is that the Incas expanded their territorial power into the relatively well-populated eastern region Eastern Diaguita valleys (present-day Argentina) to obtain labor to send to Chilean mining districts. The Incas influenced Diaguitas, who adopted Incan metalworking techniques.

Farther south in Chile, Mapuche tribes within or near the Incan Empire paid tributes in gold. Incan yanakuna are believed by archaeologists Tom Dillehay and Américo Gordon to have extracted gold south of the Incan frontier in free Mapuche territory. Following that thought, the main motive for Incan expansion into Mapuche territory would have been to access gold mines. Among the Mapuche people of central and south-central Chile, gold had an important cultural significance that predates Inca contact. At the time of the Spanish conquest of Chile, Mapuches are reported by various chroniclers to use gold ornaments. According to historian Osvaldo Silva, gold ornaments of the Mapuche of the Concepción area evidence some kind of interaction between the Mapuche and the Inca that may have been trade, gifts, or spoils of war taken from a defeated Inca army. Pre-Hispanic Mapuche tools are known to have been relatively simple and made of wood and stone, but a few of them were actually made of copper and bronze.

=== Iron ===
Iron was never smelted by Native Americans, thus the New World never entered a proper "Iron Age" before European contact, and the term is not used with regard to the Americas. But there was limited use of native (unsmelted) iron ore, from magnetite, iron pyrite and ilmenite (iron–titanium), especially in the Andes (Chavin and Moche cultures) and Mesoamerica, after 900 BC and until c. 500 CE. Various forms of iron ore were mined, drilled and highly polished. There is considerable evidence that this technology, its raw materials, and end products were widely traded in Mesoamerica throughout the Formative era (2000–200 BCE).

Lumps of iron pyrite, magnetite, and other materials were mostly shaped into mirrors, pendants, medallions, and headdress ornaments for decorative and ceremonial effect. However, concave iron ore mirrors were apparently used for firing and optical purposes by the Olmec (1500–400 BCE) and Chavin (900–300 BCE) cultures, and ilmenite "beads" may have served as hammers for fine work. The Olmec and Izapa (300 BCE – 100 CE) also seem to have used iron magnetism to align and position monuments. They may have developed a zeroth-order compass using a magnetite bar.

Some Mesoamerican uses of native iron seem to have been military. Steven Jones proposed that the Olmec sewed ilmenite "beads" into protective mail armour or helmets. Iron pyrite mosaics and plates formed protective tezcacuitlapalli (mirrored back flap shields) and breastplate ornaments in the military attire of the Teotihuacan (100 BCE – 600 CE), Toltec (800–1150 CE) and Chichen Itza (800–1200 CE) cultures.

=== Lead ===
Lead ore (galena) in relatively pure form is present geologically in a number of places in North America. Some native populations mined and used the lead.

== Central America and Caribbean ==
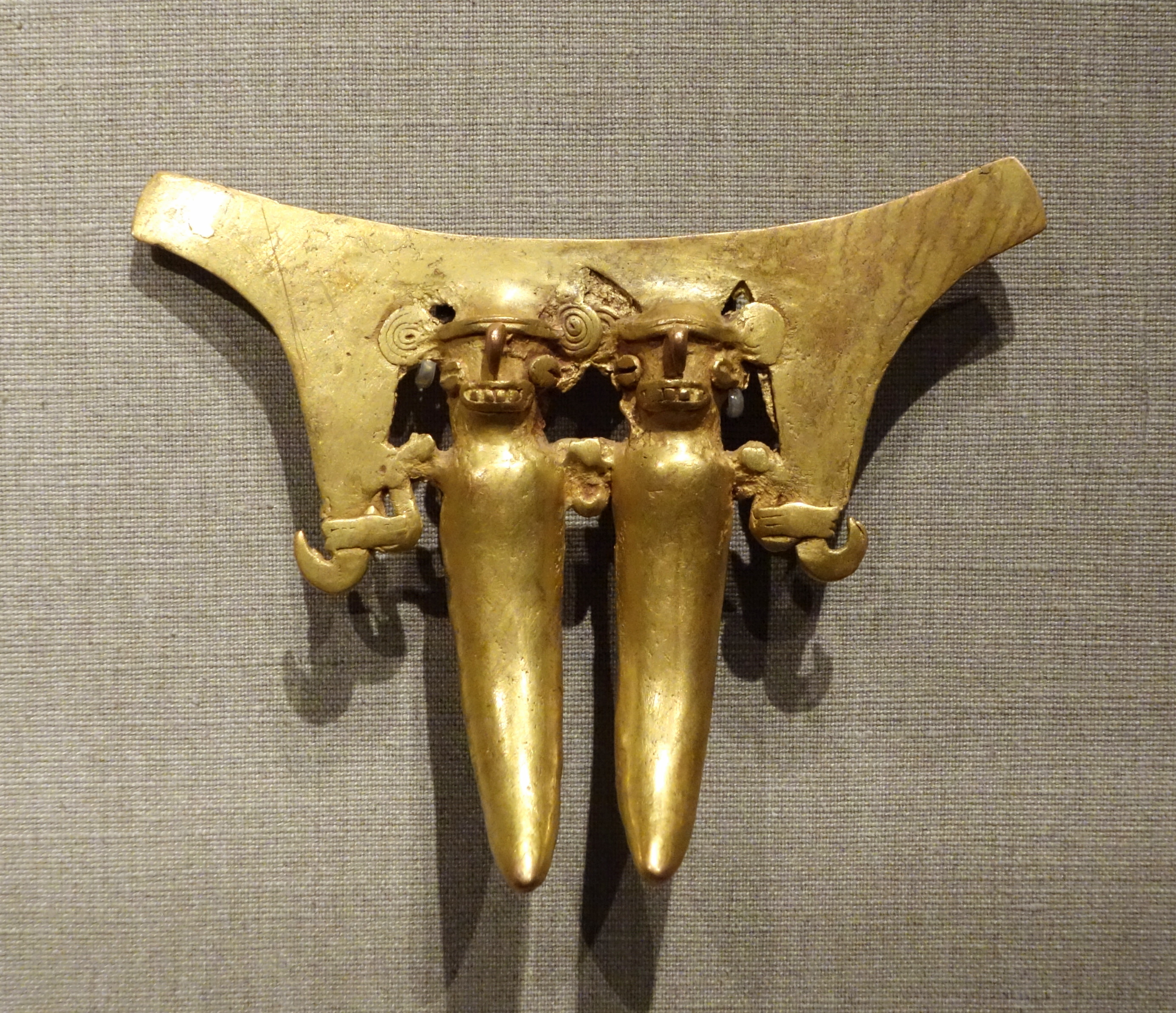
Gold double pendant, Panama, Veraguas, 11th–16th century AD

Gold, copper and tumbaga objects started being produced in Panama and Costa Rica between 300–500 CE. Open-molded casting with oxidation gilding and cast filigrees were in use. By 700–800 CE, small metal sculptures were common and an extensive range of gold and tumbaga ornaments constituted the usual regalia of persons of high status in Panama and Costa Rica.

The earliest specimen of metalwork from the Caribbean is a gold-alloy sheet carbon dated to 70–374 CE. Most Caribbean metallurgy has been dated to between 1200 and 1500 CE and consists of simple, small pieces such as sheets, pendants, beads and bells. These are mostly gold or a gold alloy (with copper or silver) and have been found to be largely cold hammered and sand-polished alluvial nuggets, although a few items seem to have been produced by lost wax casting. It is presumed that at least some of these items were acquired by trade from Colombia.

== Mesoamerica ==
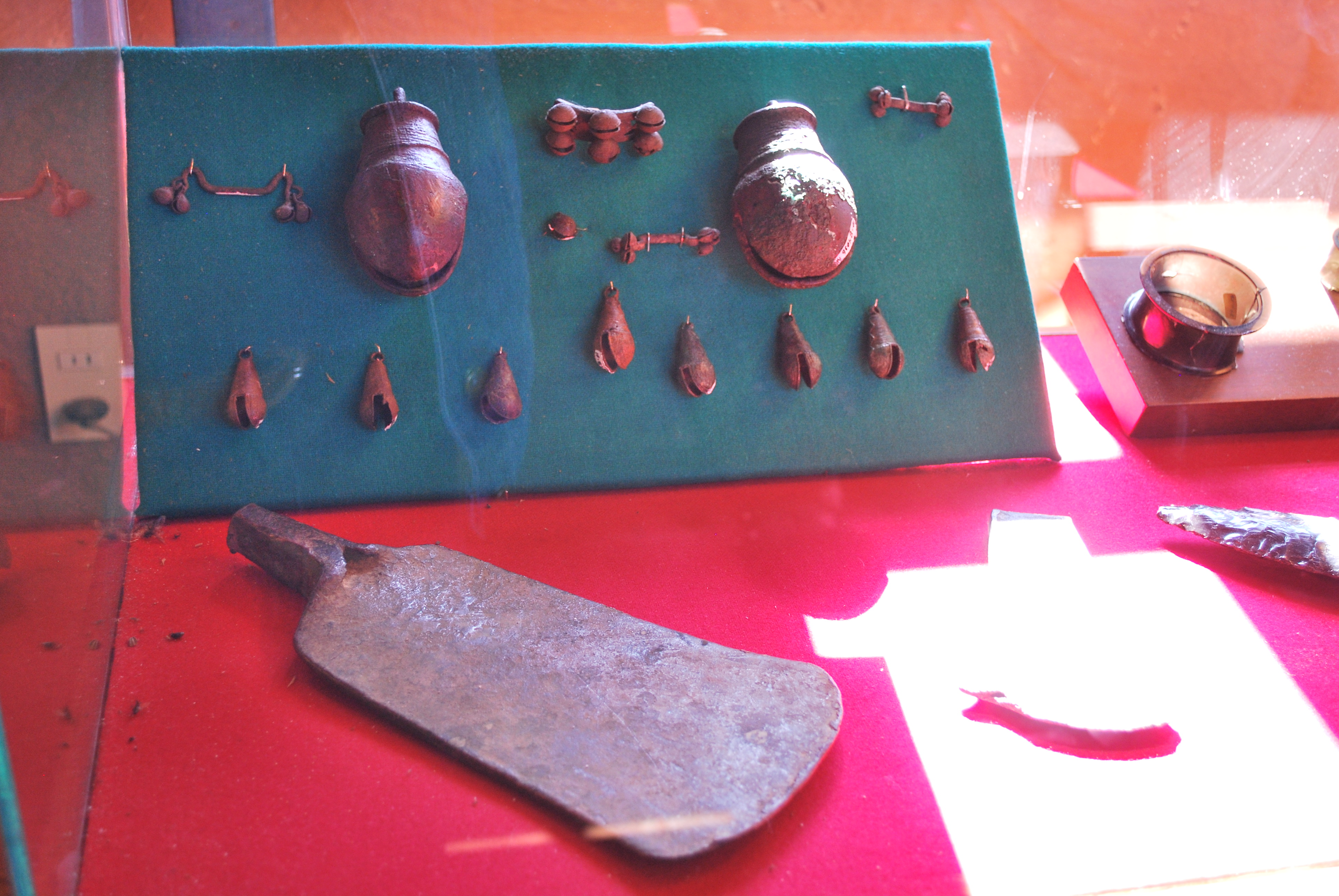
Copper alloy bells and tool, Tarascan state (1300 to 1530)

Metallurgy only appears in Mesoamerica in 800 CE with the best evidence from West Mexico. Much like in South America, fine metals were seen as a material for the elite. Metal's special qualities of colour and resonance seemed to have appealed most and then led to the particular technological developments seen in the region.

Exchange of experiences with people from Ecuador and Colombia region seems to have fueled early interest and development. Similar metal artifact types are found in West Mexico and the two regions: copper rings, needles, and tweezers being fabricated in the same ways as in Ecuador and also found in similar archaeological contexts. A multitude of bells were also found, but in this case they were cast using the same lost-wax casting method as seen in Colombia. During this period, copper was being used almost exclusively.

Continual contact kept the flow of ideas from that same region and later, coinciding with the development of Andean long distance maritime trade, influence from further south seems to have reached the region and led to a second period (1200–1300 CE to the Spanish arrival). By this time, copper alloys were being explored by West Mexican metallurgists, partly because the different mechanical properties were needed to fashion specific artifacts, particularly axe-monies – further evidence for contact with the Andean region. However, in general the new properties such alloys introduced were developed to meet regional needs, especially wirework bells, which at times had such high tin content in the bronze that it was irrelevant for its mechanical properties but gave the bells a golden colour.

The actual artifacts and then techniques were imported from the south, but west Mexican metallurgists worked ores from the abundant local deposits; the metal was not being imported. Even when the technology spread from West into north-eastern, central and southern Mexico, artifacts that can be traced back to West Mexican ores are abundant, if not exclusive. It is not always clear if the metal reached its final destination as an ingot, an ore or a finished artifact. Provenance studies on metal artifacts from southern Mesoamerica cast with the lost wax technique and dissimilar to west Mexican artifacts have shown that there might have been a second point of emergence of metallurgy into Mesoamerica there since no known source could be identified. In the Tarascan Empire, copper and bronze was used for chisels, punches, awls, tweezers, needles, axes, discs, and breastplates.

The Aztecs did not initially adopt metal working, even though they had acquired metal objects from other peoples. However, as conquest gained them metal working regions, the technology started to spread. By the time of the Spanish conquest, a bronze-smelting technology had already been developed. Spanish conquistadors used indigenous smelting technology to produce weapons and tools.

== Northern America ==
Archaeological evidence has not revealed metal smelting or alloying of metals by pre-Columbian native peoples north of the Rio Grande; however, they did use native copper extensively.

Iron was produced by the Vikings on Newfoundland around 1021 CE. Excavations at L'Anse aux Meadows have found considerable evidence for the processing of bog iron and the production of iron ore. The settlement at L'Anse aux Meadows was situated immediately east of a sedge peat bog and 15 kg of slag was found at the site, which would have produced around 3 kg of usable iron. Analysis of the slag showed that considerably more iron could have been smelted out of the ore, indicating that the workers processing the ore had not been skilled. This supports the idea that iron processing knowledge was widespread and not restricted to major centers of trade and commerce. Ninety-eight nail fragments were also found at the site as well as considerable evidence for woodworking which points to the iron produced at the site possibly being used only for ship repair and not tool making.

=== Old Copper Culture ===
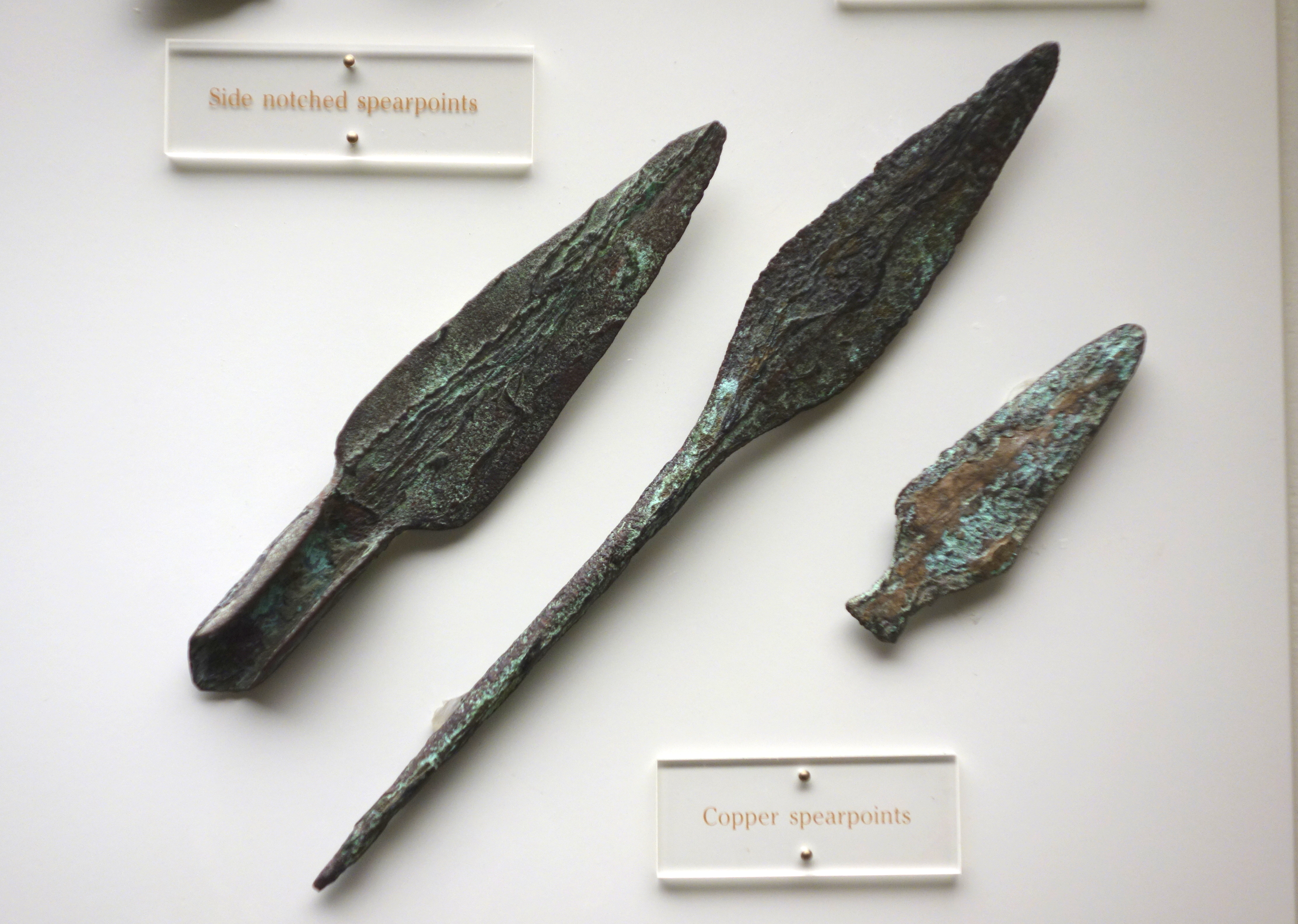
Copper spear points, Late Archaic period, Wisconsin, 3000 BC-1000 BC

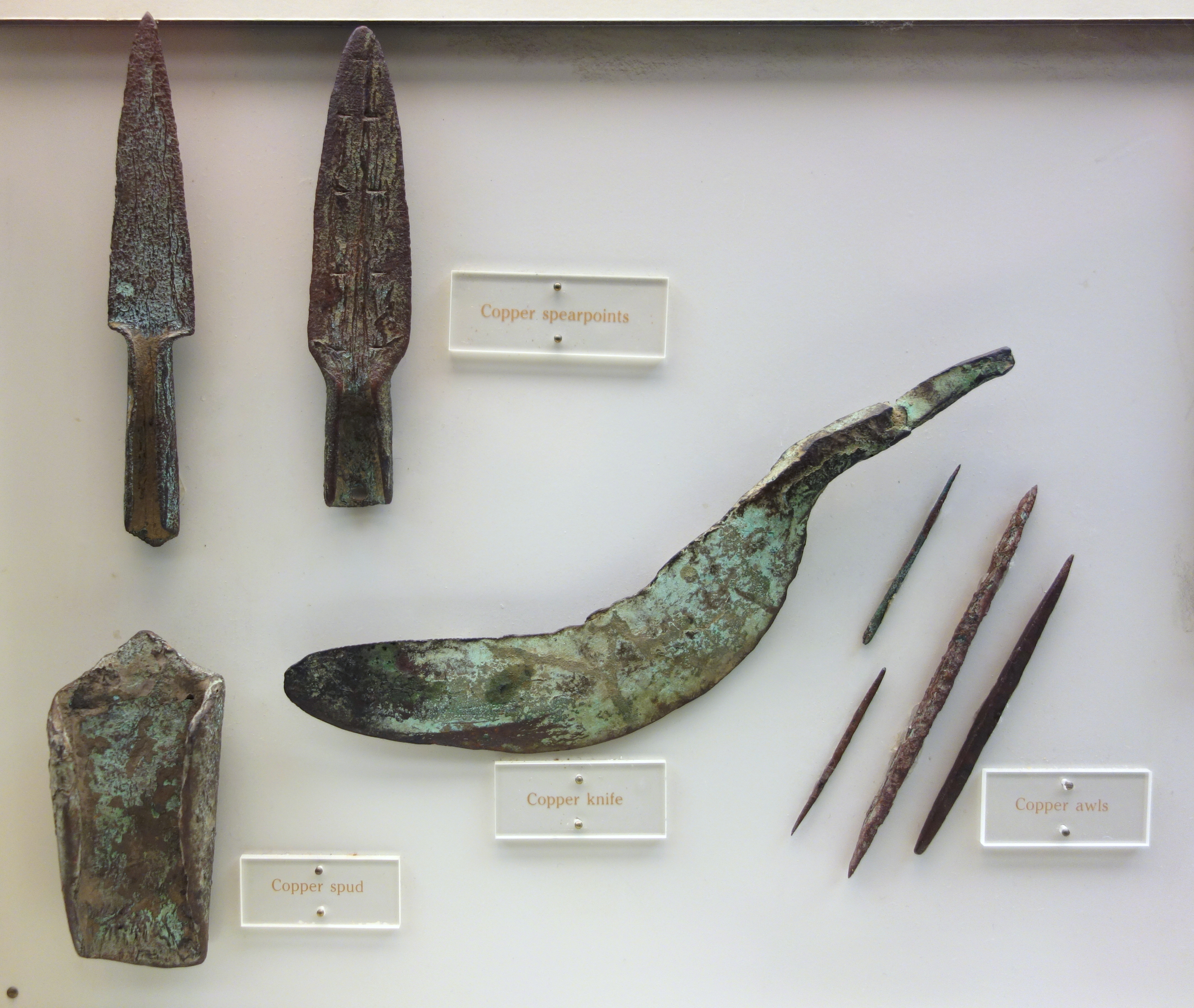
Copper knife, spearpoints, awls, and spud, Late Archaic period, Wisconsin, 3000 BC-1000 BC - Wisconsin Historical Museum - DSC03436

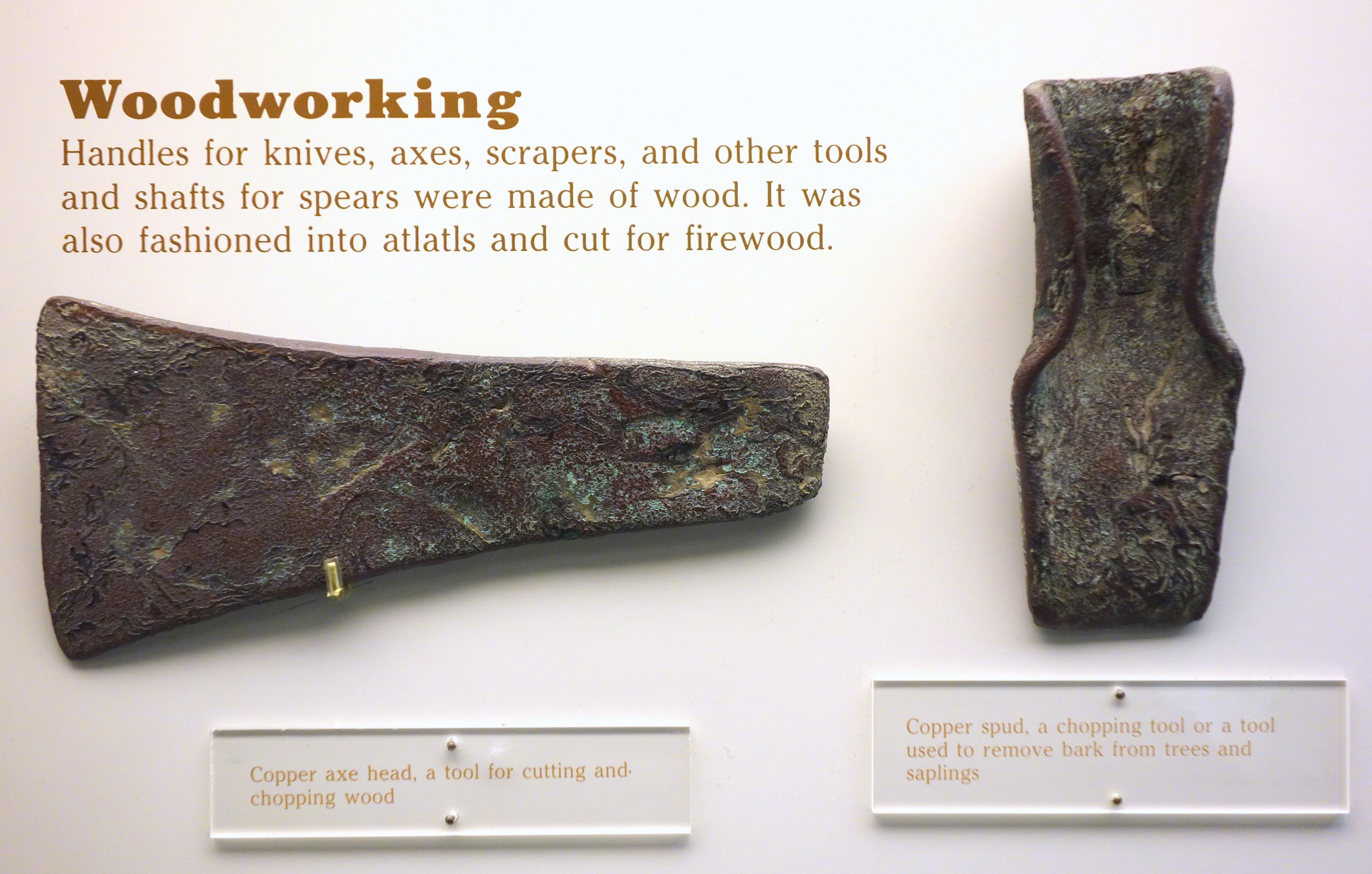
Copper ax head and spud, Late Archaic period, Wisconsin, 3000 BC-1000 BC - Wisconsin Historical Museum - Wisconsin Historical Museum - DSC03440

Pure native copper was abundant in the Great Lakes region, particularly Michigan, but Wisconsin, Minnesota, and Manitoba as well. The last glacial period had left copper bearing rock exposed and scoured bare. Once the ice retreated, loose pieces were readily available in a variety of sizes for use. Copper was cold hammered into objects from very early in the Archaic period (in the region: 8000–1000 BC). There is also evidence the indigenous people of the Old Copper Complex mined copper veins in the rock, but disagreement exists as to when.

Extraction would have been extremely difficult. Hammerstones may have been used to break off pieces to be worked. This labor-intensive process might have been eased by building a fire on top of the deposit to soften the metal.

The copper could then be cold-hammered into shape, which would make it brittle, or hammered and heated in an annealing process to avoid this. The final object would then have to be ground and sharpened using native sandstone. Numerous bars have been found with no identified purpose like trade or barter.

Great Lake artifacts found in the Eastern Woodlands of North America seem to indicate there were widespread trading networks by 1000 BC. Progressively the usage of copper for tools decreases with more jewelry and adornments being found. This is believed to be indicative of social changes to a more hierarchical society. Thousands of copper mining pits have been found along the shores of Lake Superior, and Isle Royale. These pits may have been in use as far back as 8,000 years ago. This copper was mined and then made into objects such as heavy spear points and tools of all kinds. It was also made into crescent objects similar to bannerstones that some archaeologists believe were for religious or ceremonial purposes. The crescents were too delicate for utilitarian use. Many have 28 or 29 notches along the inner edge, the approximate number of days in a lunar month.

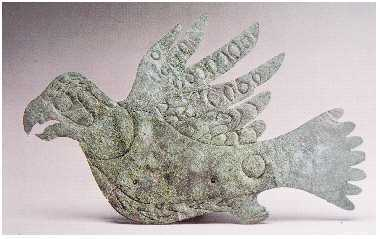
Hopewell copper falcon, c. 200 BC – 1 CE, Ohio

The Old Copper Culture flourished mainly in the Lake Superior region. The Milwaukee Public Museum has an extensive display of objects. At least 50 Old Copper items, including spear points and ceremonial crescents have been discovered in Manitoba. A few more in Saskatchewan, and at least one, a crescent, has turned up in Alberta, 2,000 kilometres from its origin in Ontario. It is most likely that these copper items arrived in the plains as trade goods rather than people of the Old Copper Culture moving into these new places. However from one excavated site in eastern Manitoba it can be seen that some people were moving northwest. At a site near Bissett archaeologists have found copper tools, weapons, and waste material of manufacture, along with a large nugget of raw copper. This site however was dated to around 4,000 years ago, a time of cooler climate when the boreal forest's treeline moved much further south. Though if these migrants moved with their metallurgy up the Winnipeg River at that time they may have continued to Lake Winnipeg, and the Saskatchewan River system.

The Old Copper Culture did not develop advanced metallurgy like the principle of creating alloys. This means that many, though they could make metal objects and weapons, continued to use their flint, which could maintain a sharper edge for much longer. The unalloyed copper could simply not compete in daily utilization. In the later days of the Culture the metal was almost exclusively used for ceremonial items.

However, Lake Superior, as a unique source of copper for over 6,000 years has recently come into some criticism, particularly since other deposits have been found that other archaic cultures mined on a much smaller scale.

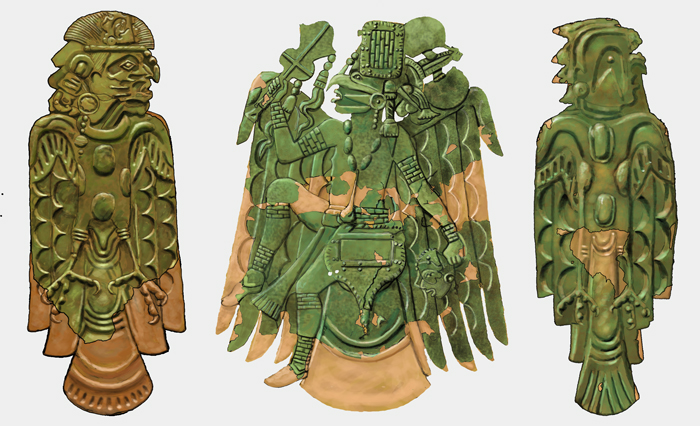
Plates from Malden, Etowah and Spiro

=== Copper in the Mississippian culture ===
During the Mississippian period (800–1600 CE, varying locally), elites at major political and religious centers throughout the midwestern and southeastern United States used copper ornamentation as a sign of their status by crafting the sacred material into representations connected with the Chiefly Warrior cult of the Southeastern Ceremonial Complex (S.E.C.C.). This ornamentation includes Mississippian copper plates, repousséd plates of beaten copper now found as far afield as Alabama, Florida, Georgia, Illinois, Mississippi, Oklahoma, and Tennessee. Some of the more famous of the plates are of raptorial birds and avian-themed dancing warriors. These plates, such as the Rogan plates from Etowah, the Spiro plates from the Spiro in Oklahoma, and the Wulfing cache from southeast Missouri, were instrumental in the development of the archaeological concept known as the S.E.C.C.

The only Mississippian culture site where a copper workshop has been located by archaeologists is Cahokia in western Illinois, where a copper workshop dating to the Moorehead Phase (c. 1200 CE) was identified at Mound 34. Gregory Perino identified the site in 1956 and archaeologists subsequently excavated it.

Numerous copper fragments were found at the site; metallographic analysis indicated that Mississippian copper workers worked copper into thin sheet through repeated hammering and annealing, a process that could be successful over open-pit wood fires.

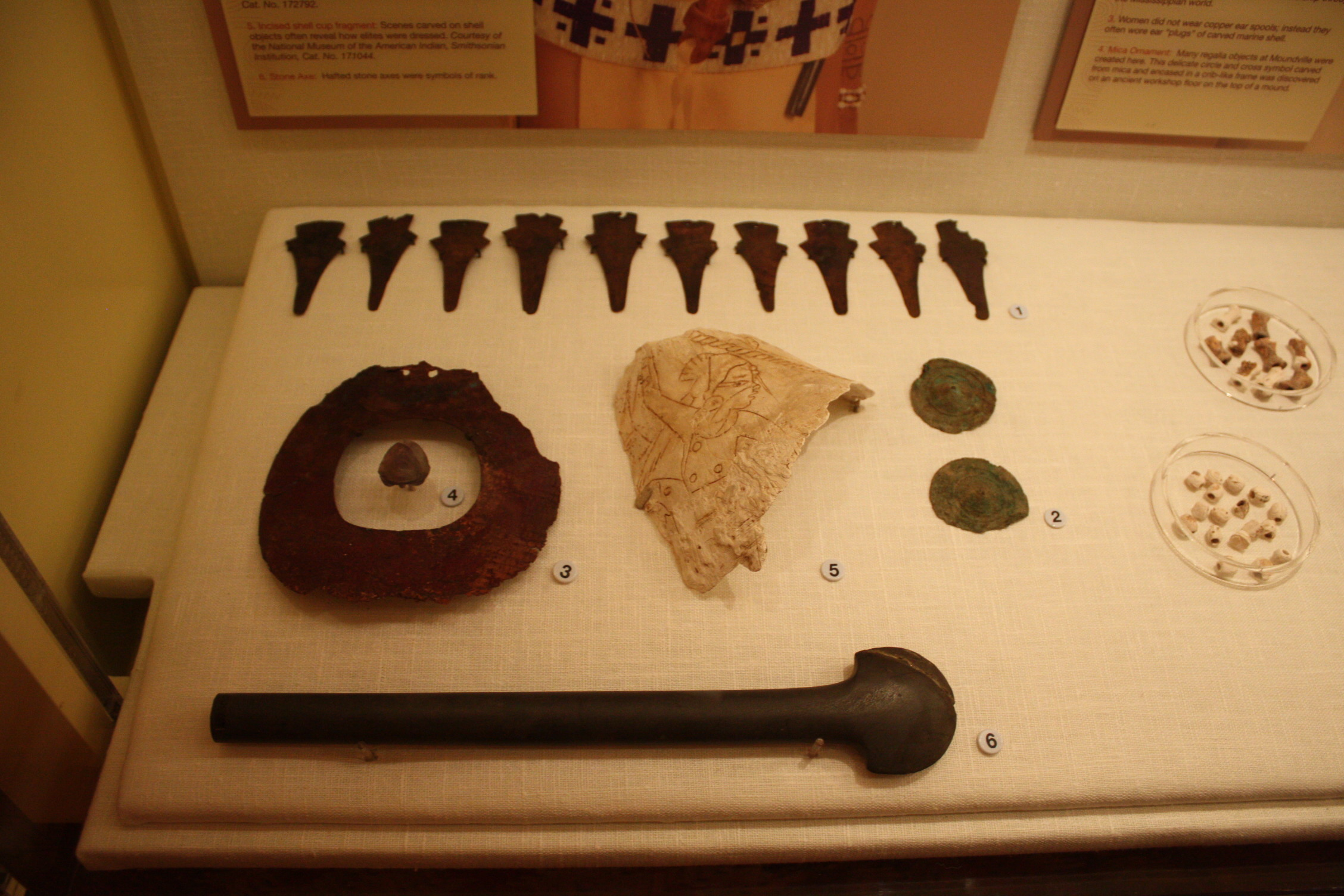
Mace shaped copper headdress ornaments from Moundville

After the collapse of the Mississippian way of life in the 1500s with the advent of European colonization, copper still retained a place in Native American religious life as a special material. Copper was traditionally regarded as sacred by many historic period Eastern tribes. Copper nuggets are included in medicine bundles among Great Lakes tribes. Among 19th century Muscogee Creeks, a group of copper plates carried along the Trail of Tears are regarded as some of the tribe's most sacred items.

=== Iron in the Pacific Northwest ===
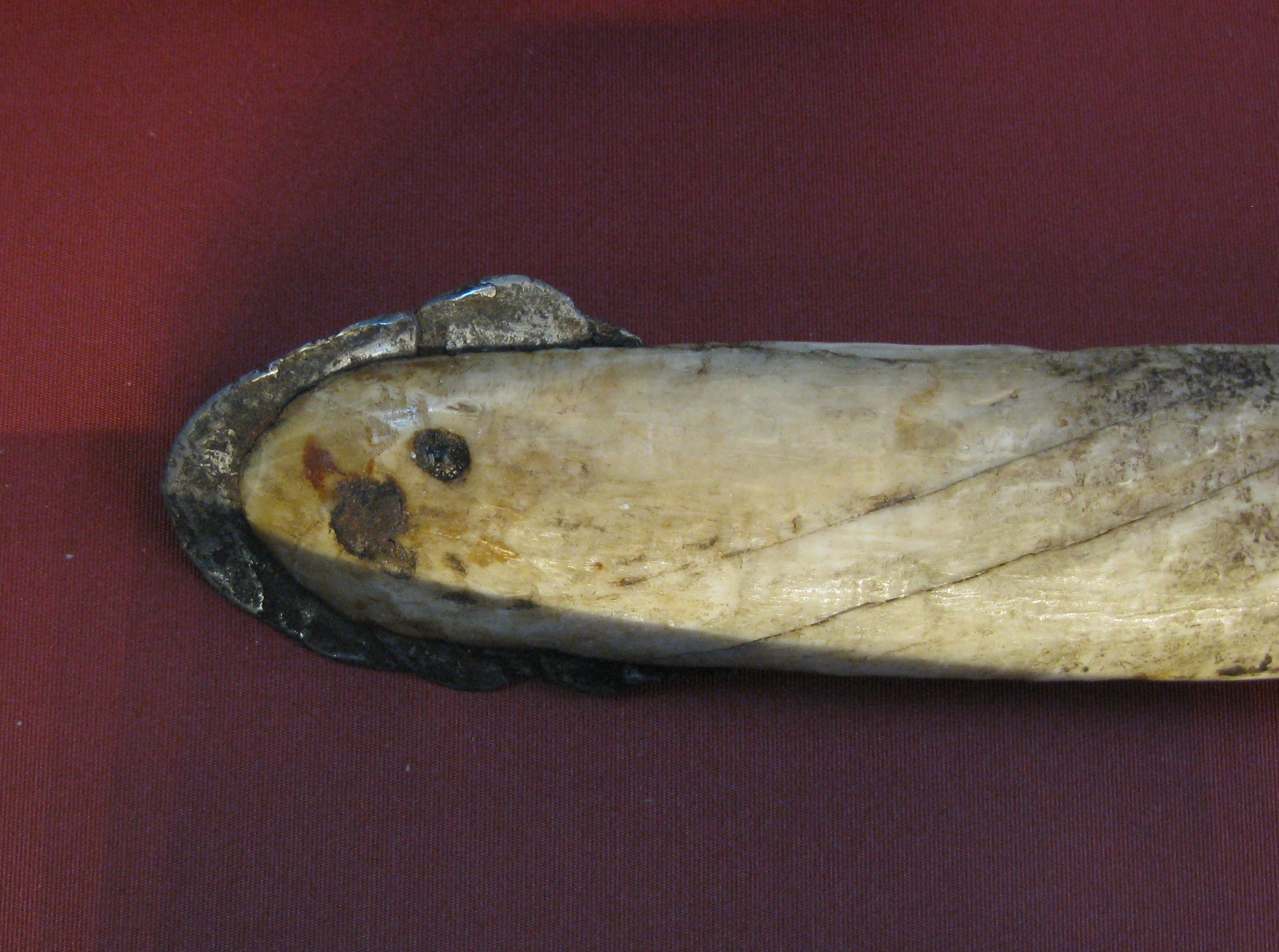
Inuit lance made from a narwhal tusk with an iron head made from the Cape York meteorite (NW Greenland).

Native ironwork in the Northwest Coast has been found in places like the Ozette Indian Village Archeological Site, where iron chisels and knives were discovered. These artifacts seem to have been crafted around 1613, based on the dendrochronological analysis of associated pieces of wood in the site, and were made out of drift iron from Asian (specifically Japanese) shipwrecks, which were swept by the Kuroshio Current towards the coast of North America.

The tradition of working with Asian drift iron was well-developed in the Northwest before European contact, and was present among several native peoples from the region, including the Chinookan peoples and the Tlingit, who seem to have had their own specific word for the metallic material, which was transcribed by Frederica De Laguna as gayES. The wrecking of Japanese and Chinese vessels in the North Pacific basin was fairly common, and the iron tools and weaponry they carried provided the necessary materials for the development of the local ironwork traditions among the Northwestern Pacific Coast peoples, although there were also other sources of iron, like that from meteorites, which was occasionally worked using stone anvils.

== See also ==
- Copper Inuit
- Mapuche silverwork
