= Pensaukee River =

River in the U.S. state of Wisconsin

Pensaukee River Pensaukie River
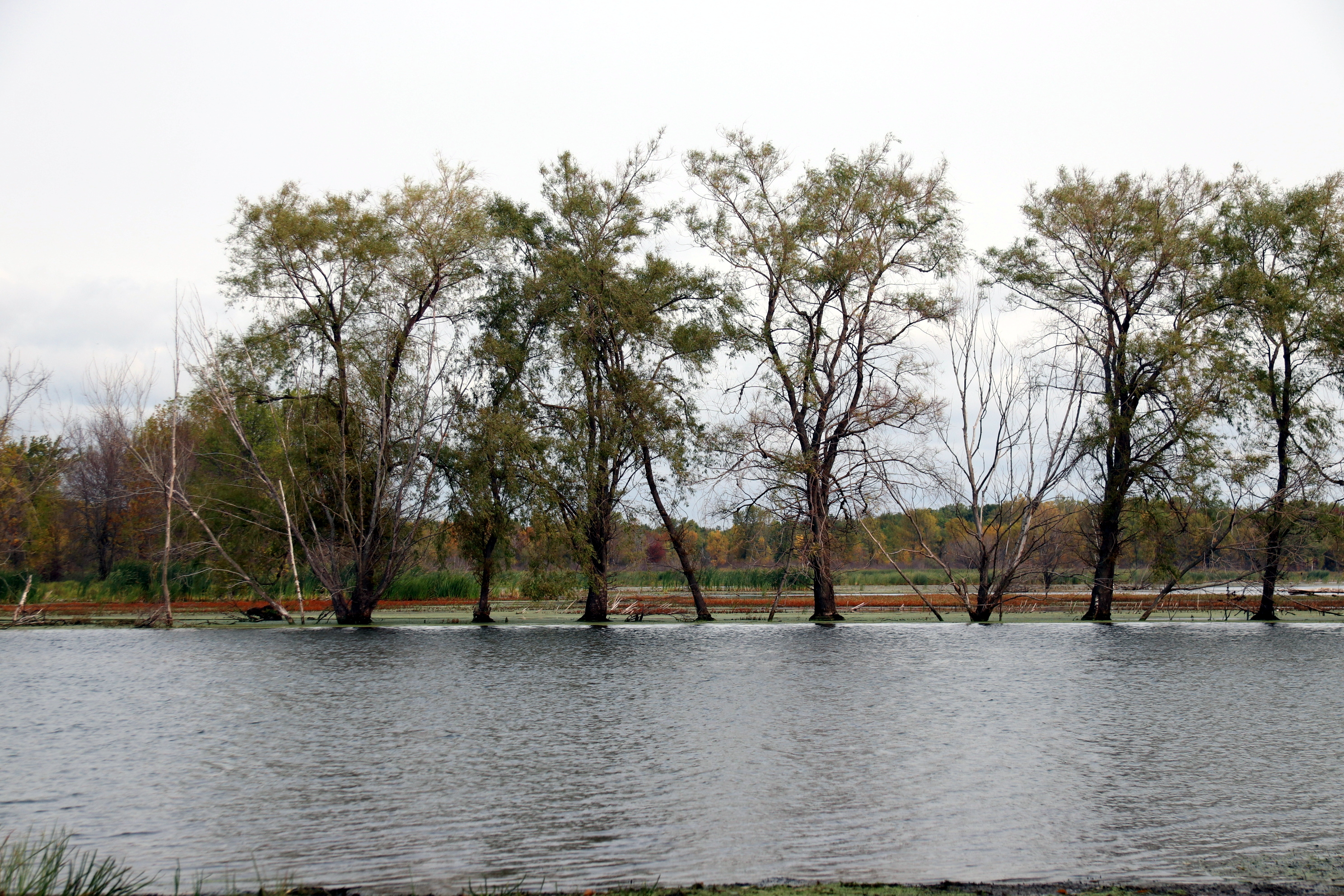
- Flooding on the Pensaukee River near its mouth at Green Bay.

- Location within Wisconsin Location within the United States

Location
- Country: United States
- State: Wisconsin

Physical characteristics
- Source: East of Bonduel
  - coordinates: 44.7436022°N 88.4103799°W
- Mouth: Green Bay
  - location: Pensaukee
  - coordinates: 44.8224914°N 87.9017697°W
  - elevation: 584 ft (178 m)

Basin features
- Tributaries
  - left: Spring Creek, North Branch Pensaukee River
  - right: Brookside Creek

The Pensaukee River is a river located in northeastern Wisconsin. It is a tributary of Lake Michigan via Green Bay.

== Route ==
The river is 47 miles (76 km) long. Its southern branch rises from Pautz Lake in Shawano County and northern branch originates in Pensaukee Lakes in Shawano County. It passes near the communities of Krakow, Klondike, Abrams, and its mouth empties into Green Bay near Pensaukee.

== Drainage basin ==
Its drainage basin covers Oconto County and Shawano County, Wisconsin. The watershed covers 160 square miles (410 km^{2}) of area. 61% of land in the drainage basin has agricultural use.
