= West Main Street Historic District (Oconto, Wisconsin) =

Historic district in Wisconsin, United States

- U.S. National Register of Historic Places
- U.S. Historic district
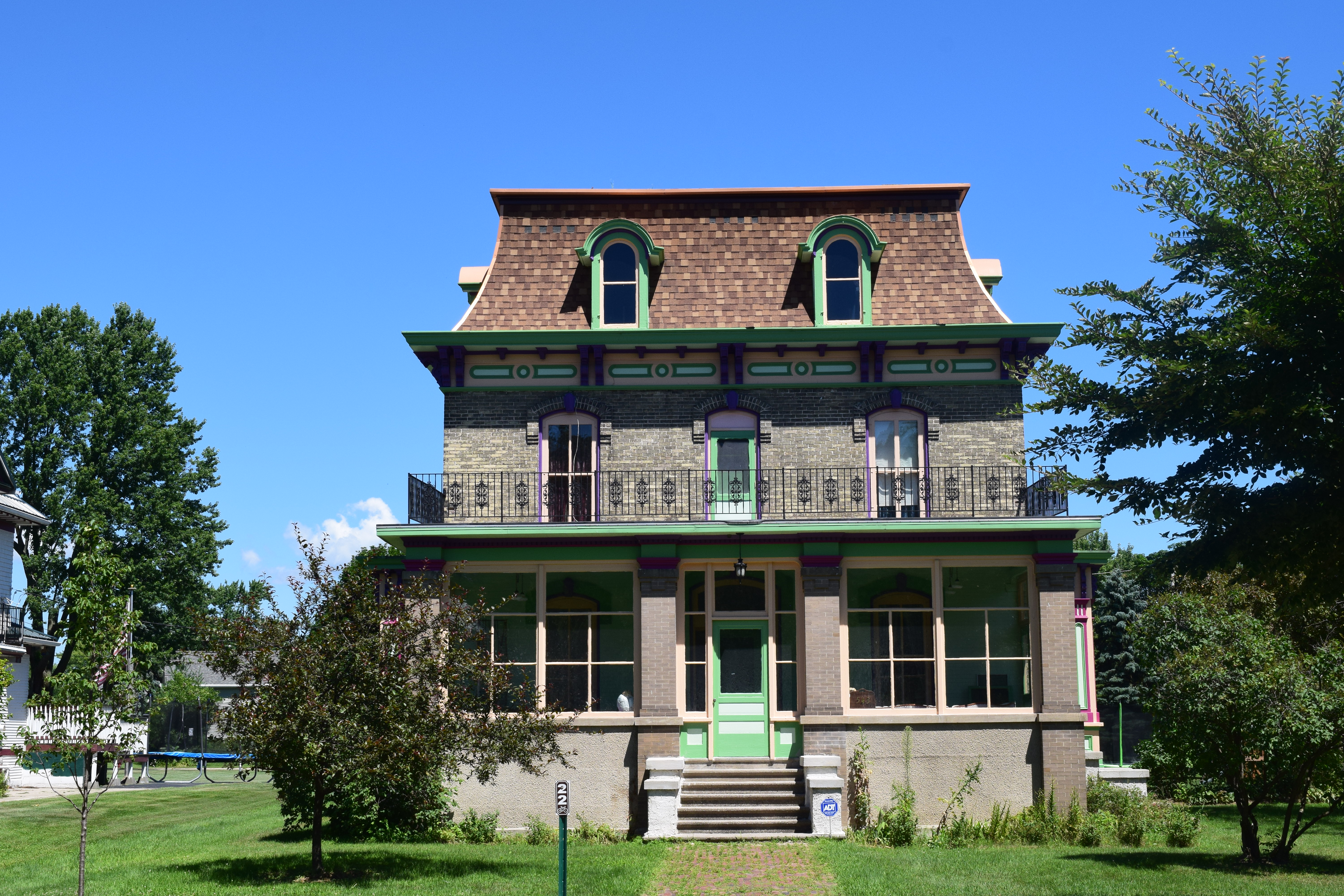
- 543 Main Street

- Location within Wisconsin Location within the United States
- Location: Main St. from Duncan to Erie Sts., Oconto, Wisconsin
- Coordinates: 44°53′23″N 87°52′30″W
- Architectural style: Greek Revival, Late Victorian
- NRHP reference No.: 79000101
- Added to NRHP: May 14, 1979

West Main Street Historic District in Oconto, Wisconsin is a historic district.

It was listed on the National Register of Historic Places in 1979.

It includes multiple buildings built during the heyday of the town's lumbering industry. Two included properties were already listed on the National Register, the First Church of Christ, Scientist (Oconto, Wisconsin) at 102 Chicago Street, and the Gov. Edward Scofield House at 610 West Main.
