= Klondike, Oconto County, Wisconsin =

Klondike, Wisconsin
- Unincorporated community
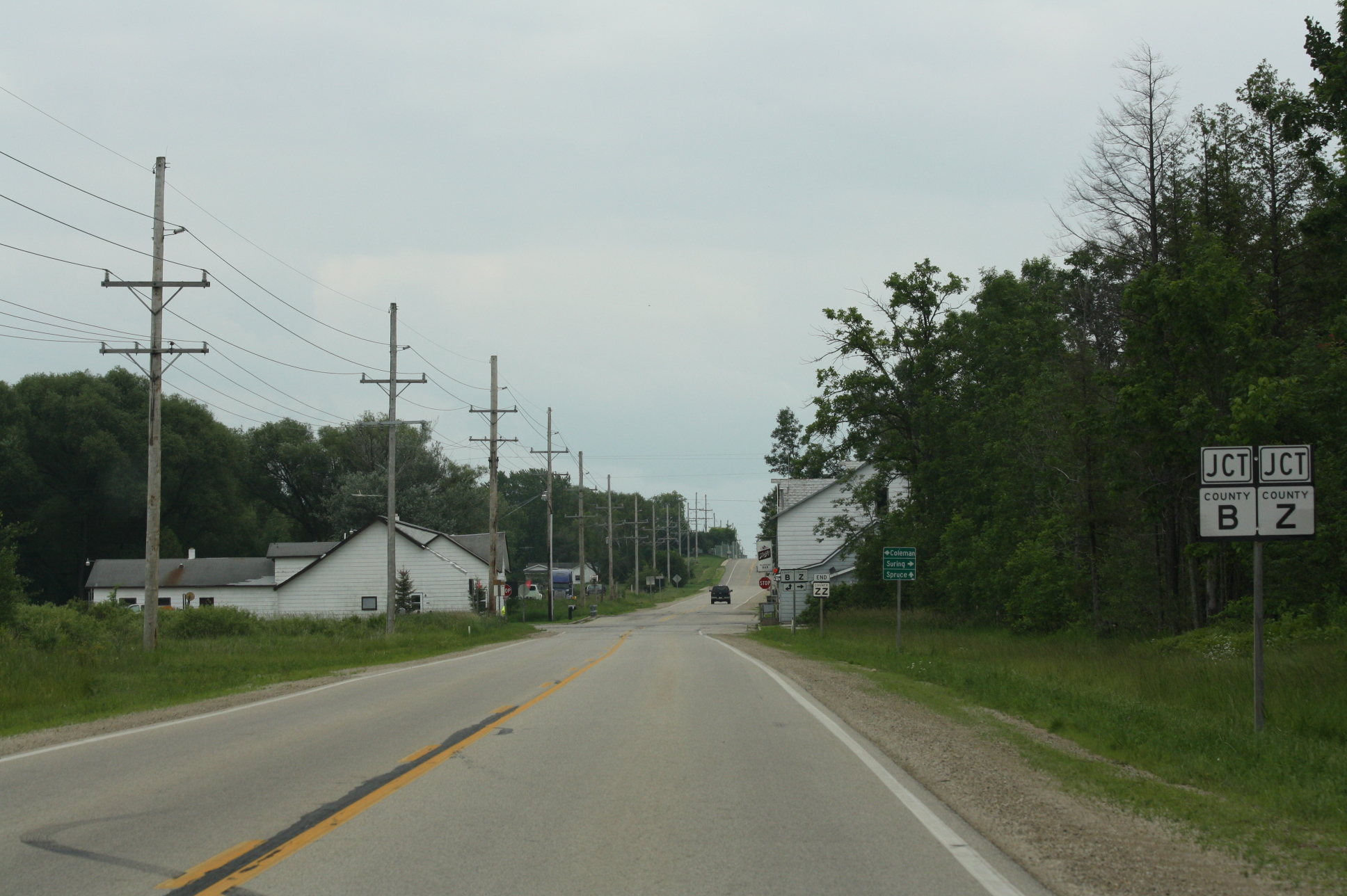
- Looking south at Klondike

- Location within Wisconsin Location within the United States
- Coordinates: 45°04′05″N 88°09′35″W
- Country: United States
- State: Wisconsin
- County: Oconto
- Elevation: 791 ft (241 m)
- Time zone: UTC-6 (Central (CST))
  - Summer (DST): UTC-5 (CDT)
- Area code: 920
- GNIS feature ID: 1567553

Klondike is an unincorporated community in Oconto County, Wisconsin, United States. The community is located at the intersection of Oconto County Highways ZZ, B, and Z, in the town of Brazeau. It is located at latitude 45.068 and longitude -88.16 at an elevation of 791 feet (mean sea level).

== Images ==
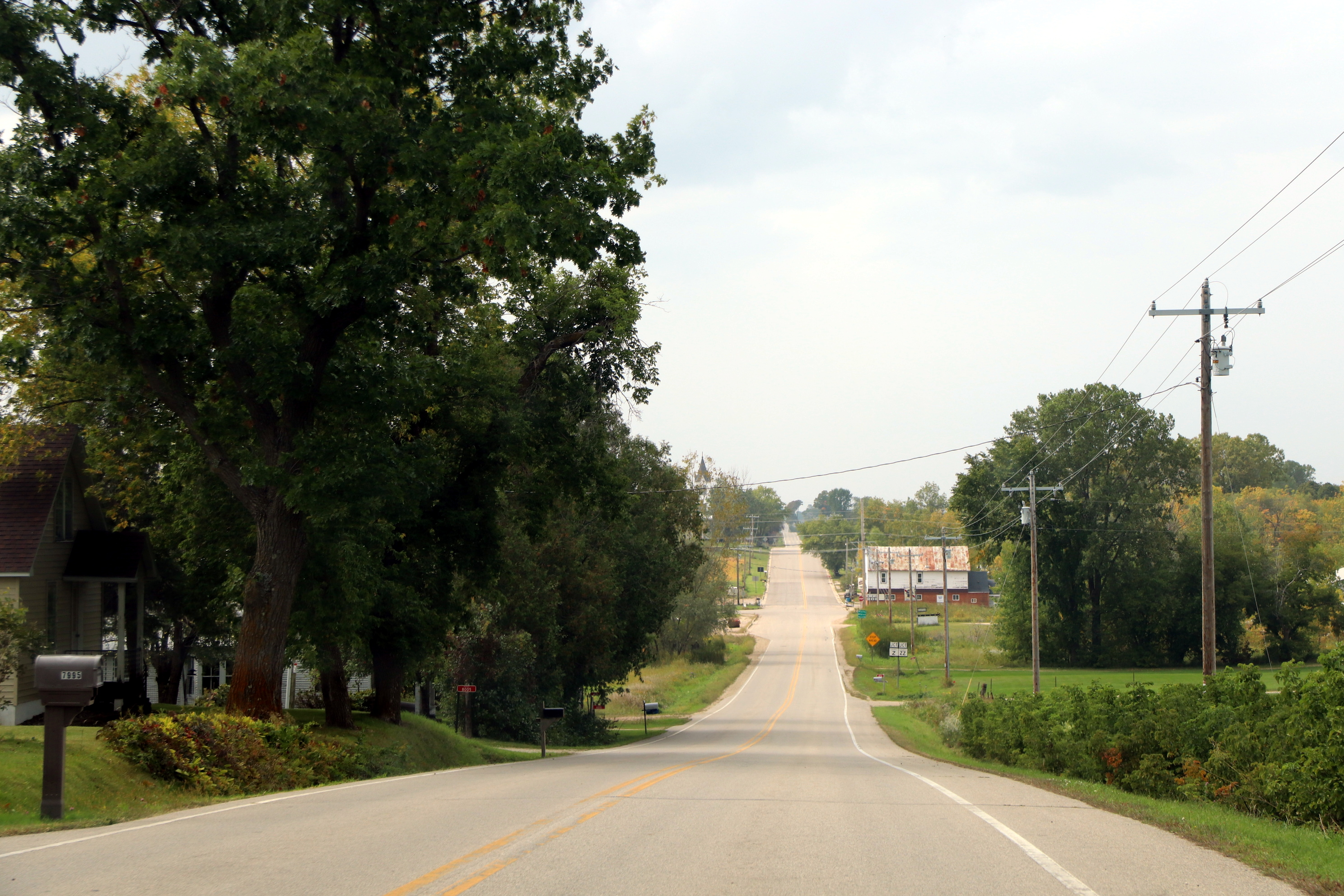
Panorama of Klondike looking west

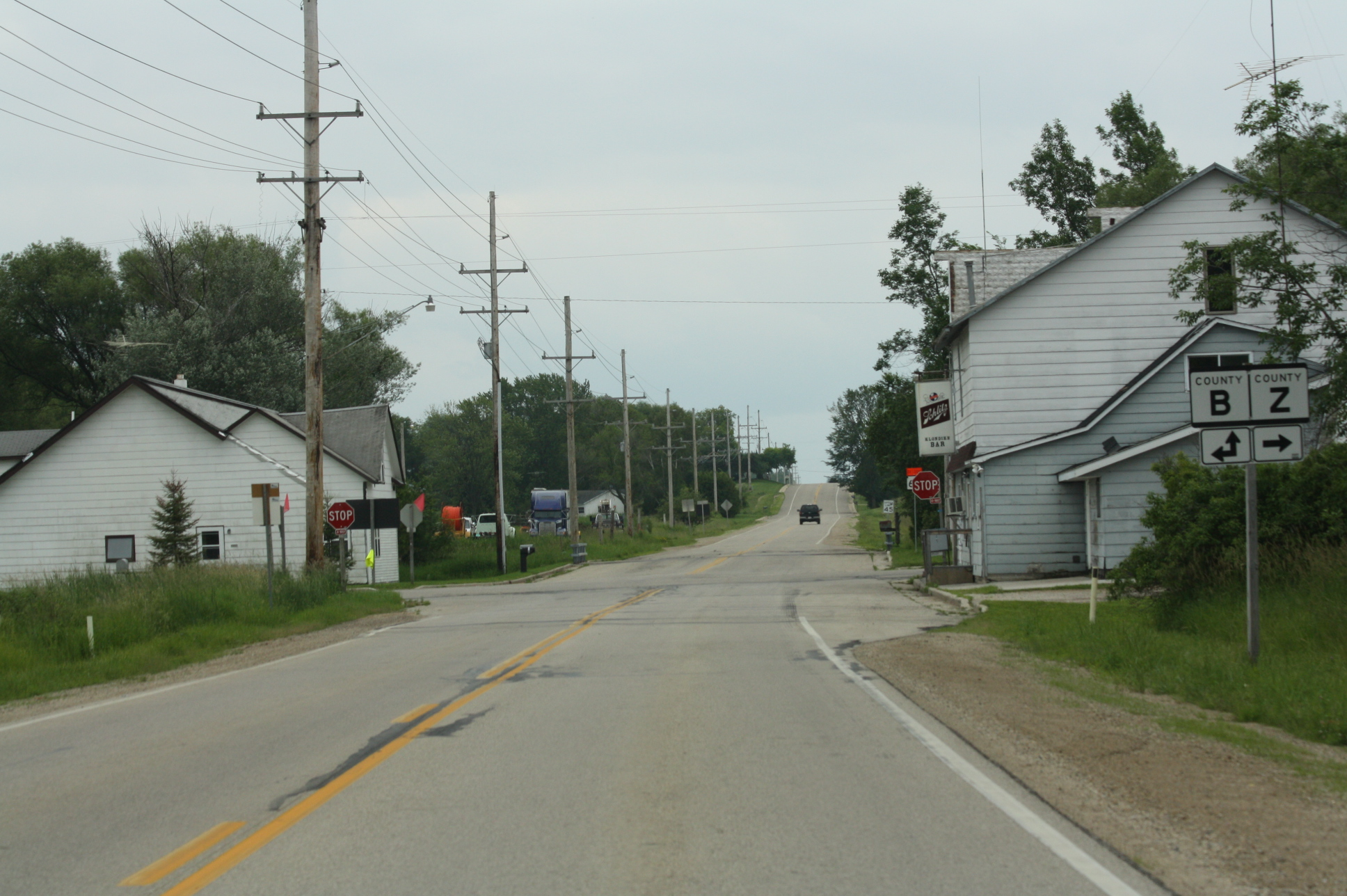
Looking south at downtown Klondike

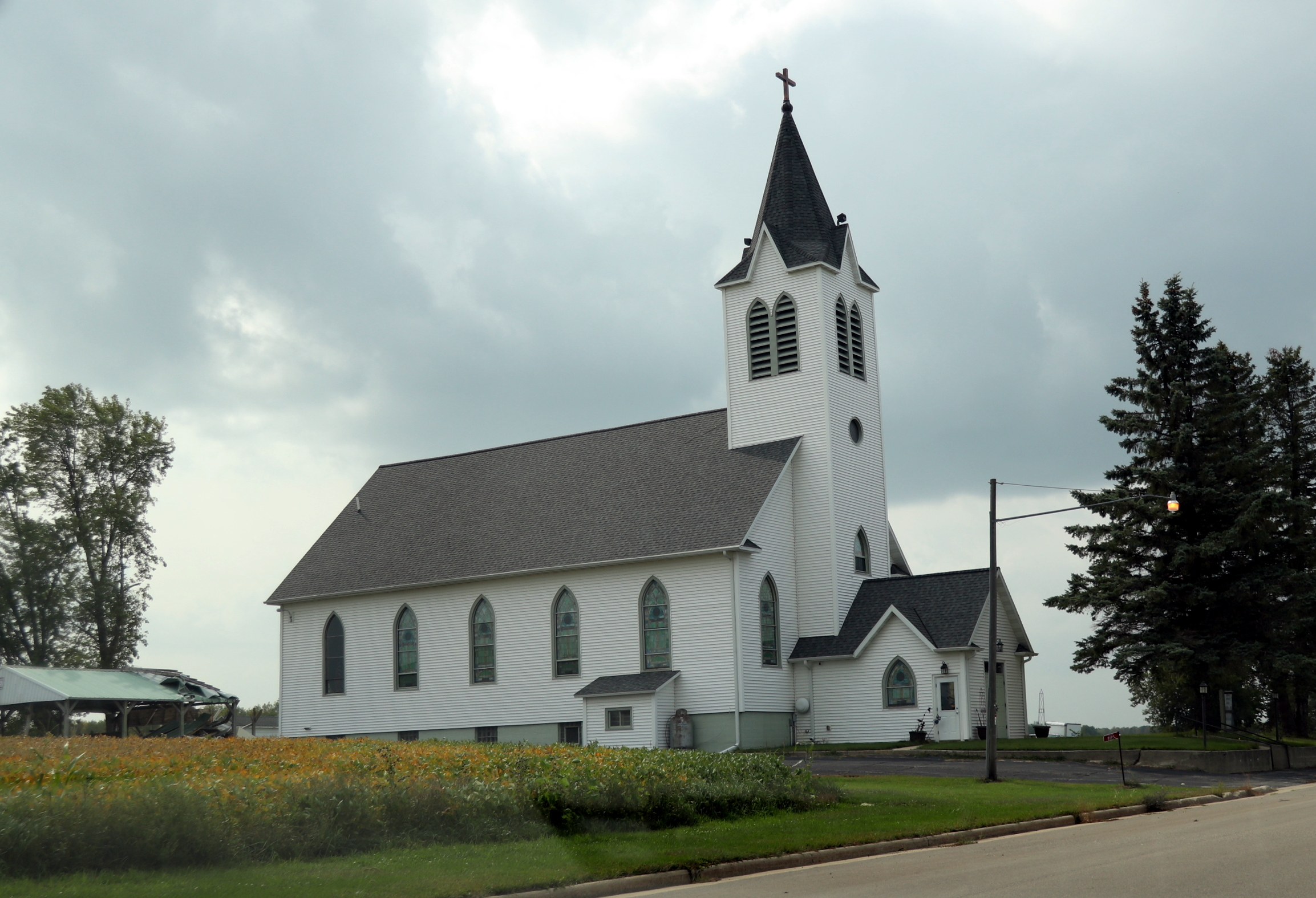
Klondike Community Church
