= St. Mark's Episcopal Church, Guild Hall and Vicarage =

Historic church in Wisconsin, United States

- U.S. National Register of Historic Places
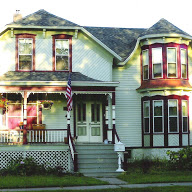

- Location within Wisconsin Location within the United States
- Location: 408 Park Ave., Oconto, Wisconsin
- Coordinates: 44°53′18″N 87°51′51″W
- Area: 0.1 acres (0.040 ha)
- Architect: A.H. James; Edward Fitzgerald
- Architectural style: Late Gothic Revival, Neo-Gothic
- NRHP reference No.: 85001684
- Added to NRHP: August 1, 1985

St. Mark's Episcopal Church, Guild Hall and Vicarage is a historic Episcopal church complex in Oconto, Wisconsin, with its buildings in architectural styles popular when they were constructed. The complex was added to the National Register of Historic Places on August 1, 1985, for its architectural significance.

St. Mark's church is a Neogothic-styled building designed by A.H. James of Kansas City and built in 1900. It has walls of limestone with low buttresses on the south side. The front gable end features an apsidiole at the center at ground level, with a rose window above that and above that on the ridge a stone cross. The main entrance is through a large square corner tower. Inside, the church has a hammerbeam ceiling. The interior was redecorated in 1911, with a maple reredos, a high altar, carved lectern, pulpit and pews. A wood screen was also added, topped with a depiction of the Crucifixion carved by the Lang family of Oberammergau.

The frame "Guild Hall" north of the current church building was built in 1866-67 across the street by the first Methodist congregation in Oconto. Typical of that period, its style is Greek Revival, with returned cornices and tall windows. In 1894 St. Mark's bought the building and moved it to their site to replace their original building. Only six years later, St. Mark's had outgrown it and built their current church, eventually converting the old church to a social hall. At this point, St. Mark's Guild Hall is the oldest surviving church building in Oconto.

What is now called the vicarage, north of the guild hall, was built in 1871 by lumberman Edward Fizgerald as his home. Over the years the house was expanded, including bay windows by later owner Edward Davis, a clothes merchant. St. Mark's acquired the building in 1913. Today the building is an interesting combination, with the half-turret bay window and siding suggesting Queen Anne style, but the jerkin gables and fine spindles on the porch suggesting other styles.
