= Pensaukee, Wisconsin =

- Town
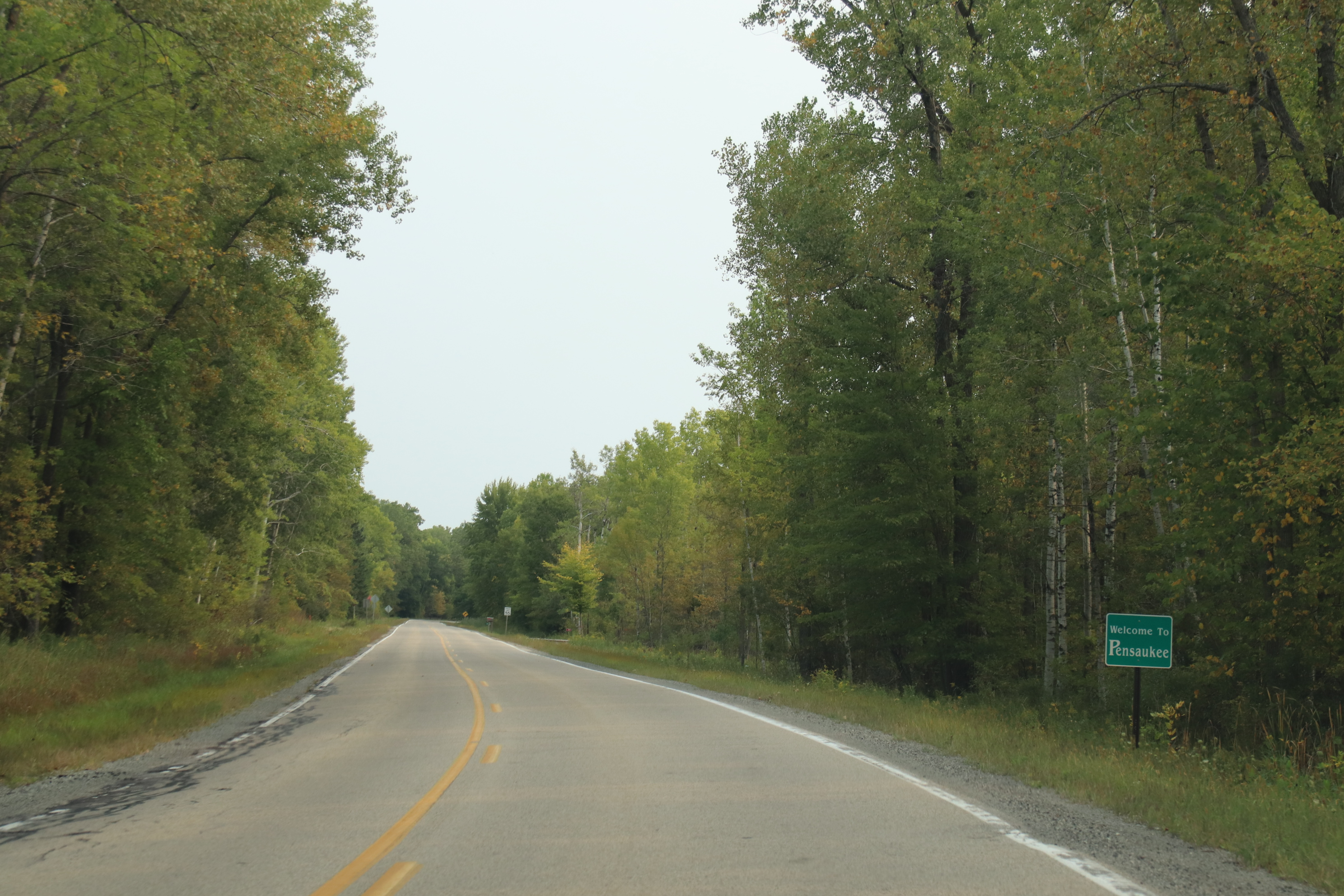
- Sign for the town of Pensaukee

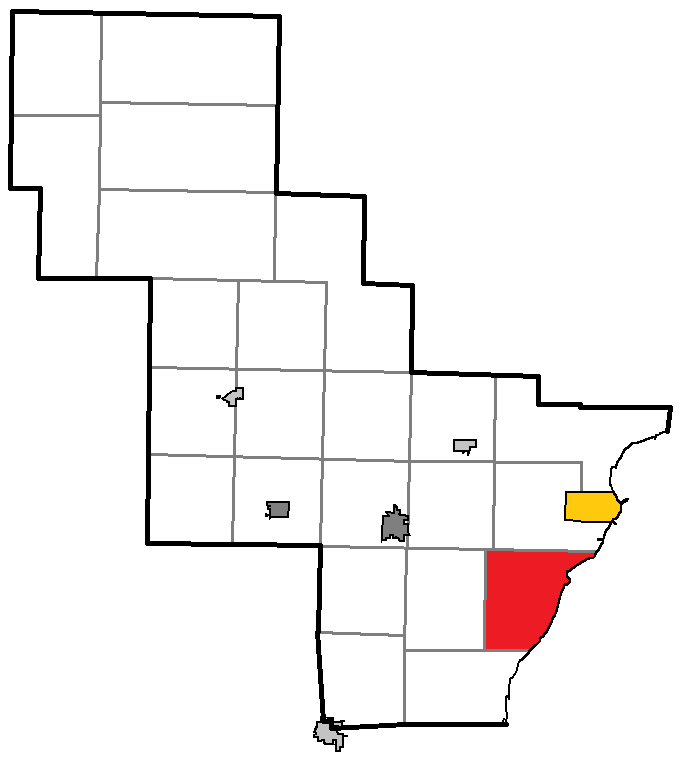
- Location of Pensaukee, within Oconto County
- Coordinates: 44°47′37″N 87°56′51″W
- Country: United States
- State: Wisconsin
- County: Oconto

Area
  - Total: 35.6 sq mi (92.3 km^{2})
  - Land: 35.5 sq mi (92.0 km^{2})
  - Water: 0.13 sq mi (0.33 km^{2})
- Elevation: 604 ft (184 m)

Population (2020)
  - Total: 1,352
  - Density: 38.1/sq mi (14.7/km^{2})
- Time zone: UTC-6 (Central (CST))
  - Summer (DST): UTC-5 (CDT)
- FIPS code: 55-61900
- GNIS feature ID: 1583907
- Website: http://www.townofpensaukee.org

Pensaukee is a town in Oconto County, Wisconsin, United States, on the coast of Green Bay. The population was 1,352 at the 2020 census.

== Communities ==
- Brookside is an unincorporated community located along County Road J and Brookside Road, north of US Highway 41. The name is taken from a nearby brook.
- Oak Orchard is an unincorporated community located along County Road S, south of Pensaukee.
- Pensaukee is an unincorporated community located at the intersection of County Road S and SS, east of US 41. The community is located at the mouth of the related Pensaukee River.

== History ==
=== Etymology ===
The name Pensaukee is of Menominee origin, reflecting the town's origin as a Menominee settlement. It is derived from pindj-sau-gee 'inside the mouth of a river'. An alternative derivation is from the Menominee word Apǣhsahkyah 'brant goose'. The town established a post office in 1855. It remained in operation until it was discontinued in 1957.

=== The Pensaukee Tornado ===
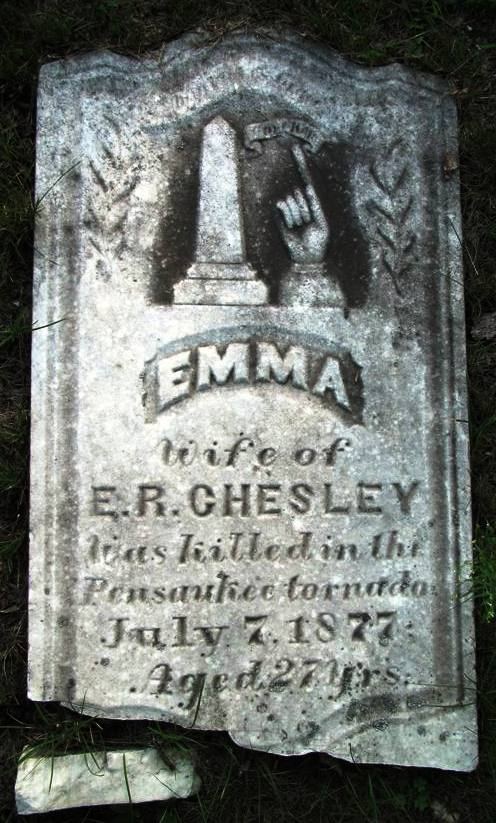
Gravestone of a victim of the Pensaukee Tornado (Evergreen Cemetery, Oconto, WI)

The lumbering community of Pensaukee was largely destroyed on July 7, 1877, by a tornado, estimated at F3 intensity on the Fujita scale. The death toll included four children and two adults, as well as 32 injuries, many horses and cattle killed, and 50 buildings destroyed, including the town's hotel (the Gardner House), sawmill, flour mill, boarding house, school, depot, and many houses and barns. The names of those killed in the two-minute disaster were reported in a telegram as "L. Zanto [Louis Zanto, 35 years old], H. Baumgardner [Herman Baumgartner, 9 years], Jr., Albert Blackbird [7 years], Mrs. E. R. Chesley [Emma Chesley, née Golather, 27 years], an infent [sic] of Farley [George Farley, 2 years], and an infant of L. Zanto [Lizzie Zanto, 6 months]."

=== New Town Hall and Fire Station ===
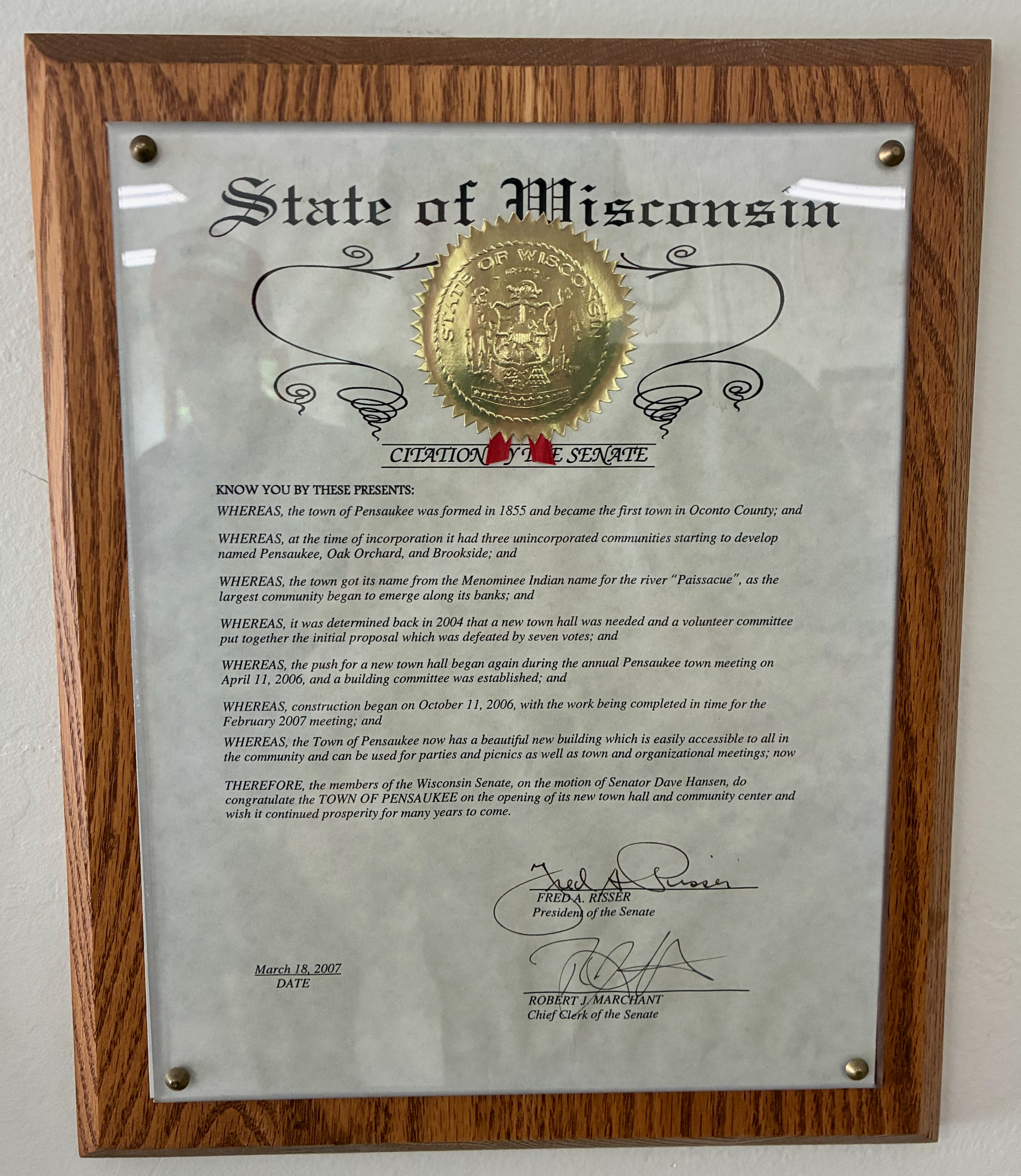
Wisconsin State Senate citation on opening of Pensaukee Town Hall and Community Center in 2007.

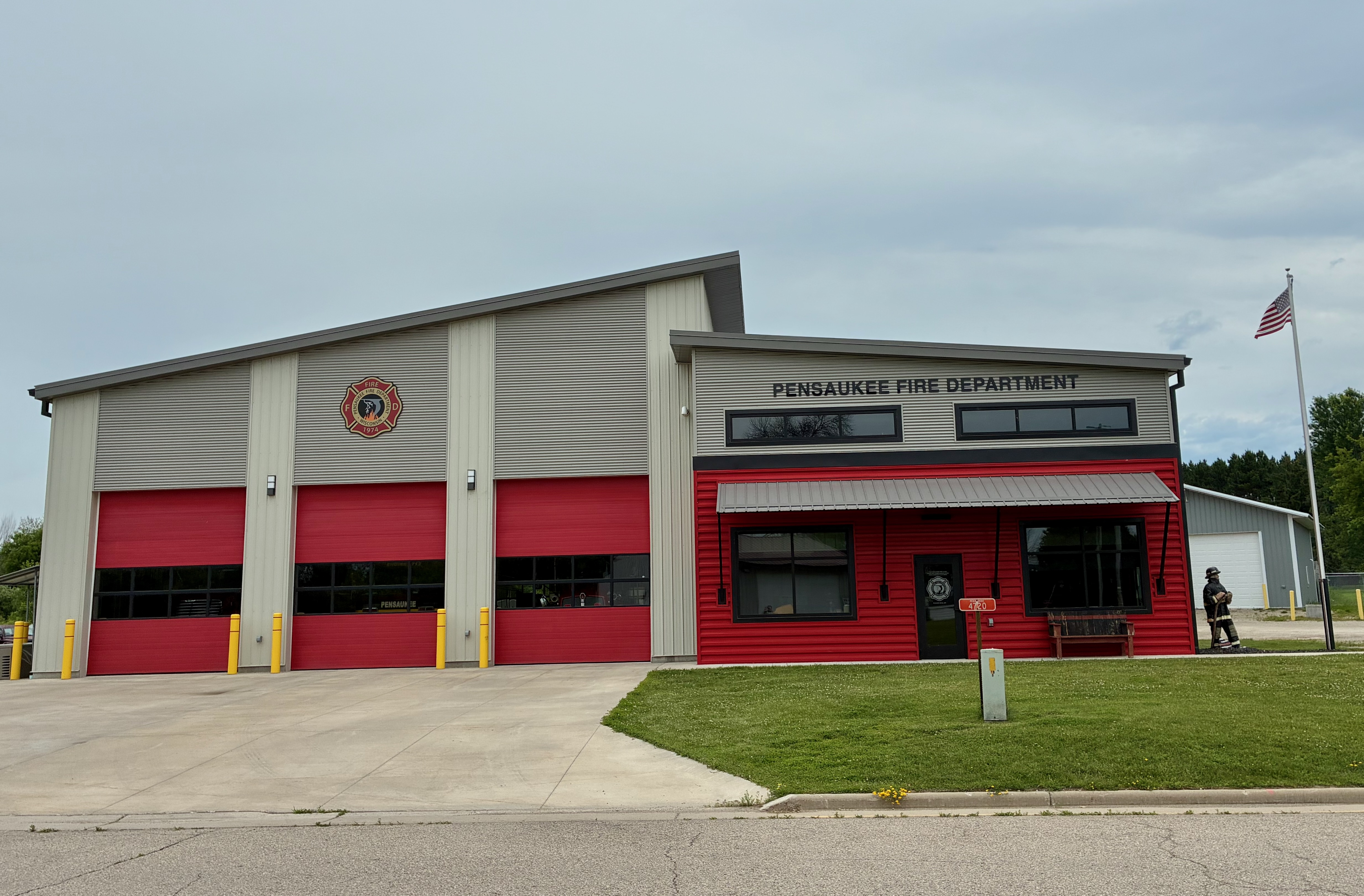
Pensaukee Fire Department Station.

The Pensaukee Town Hall and Community Center opened in 2007.

The Pensaukee Fire Department opened their new fire station in 2023.

== Geography ==
According to the United States Census Bureau, the town has a total area of 35.6 square miles (92.3 km^{2}), of which 35.5 square miles (92.0 km^{2}) is land and 0.1 square mile (0.3 km^{2}) (0.34%) is water.

== Demographics ==
As of the census of 2000, there were 1,214 people, 471 households, and 351 families residing in the town. The population density was 34.2 people per square mile (13.2/km^{2}). There were 562 housing units at an average density of 15.8 per square mile (6.1/km^{2}). The racial makeup of the town was 98.35% White, 0.25% Native American, 0.41% from other races, and 0.99% from two or more races. Hispanic or Latino of any race were 0.74% of the population.

There were 471 households, out of which 30.6% had children under the age of 18 living with them, 63.9% were married couples living together, 4.7% had a female householder with no husband present, and 25.3% were non-families. 20.4% of all households were made up of individuals, and 7.0% had someone living alone who was 65 years of age or older. The average household size was 2.58 and the average family size was 2.95.

In the town, the population was spread out, with 23.6% under the age of 18, 6.3% from 18 to 24, 32.3% from 25 to 44, 26.4% from 45 to 64, and 11.4% who were 65 years of age or older. The median age was 39 years. For every 100 females, there were 107.2 males. For every 100 females age 18 and over, there were 111.6 males.

The median income for a household in the town was $48,098, and the median income for a family was $51,875. Males had a median income of $36,563 versus $22,148 for females. The per capita income for the town was $22,600. About 2.7% of families and 3.5% of the population were below the poverty line, including 4.9% of those under age 18 and 5.2% of those age 65 or over.

== Notable people ==
- John Verkuilen, Wisconsin State Representative and farmer, was born in the town
