= First Church of Christ, Scientist (Oconto, Wisconsin) =

Historic church in Wisconsin, United States

- U.S. National Register of Historic Places
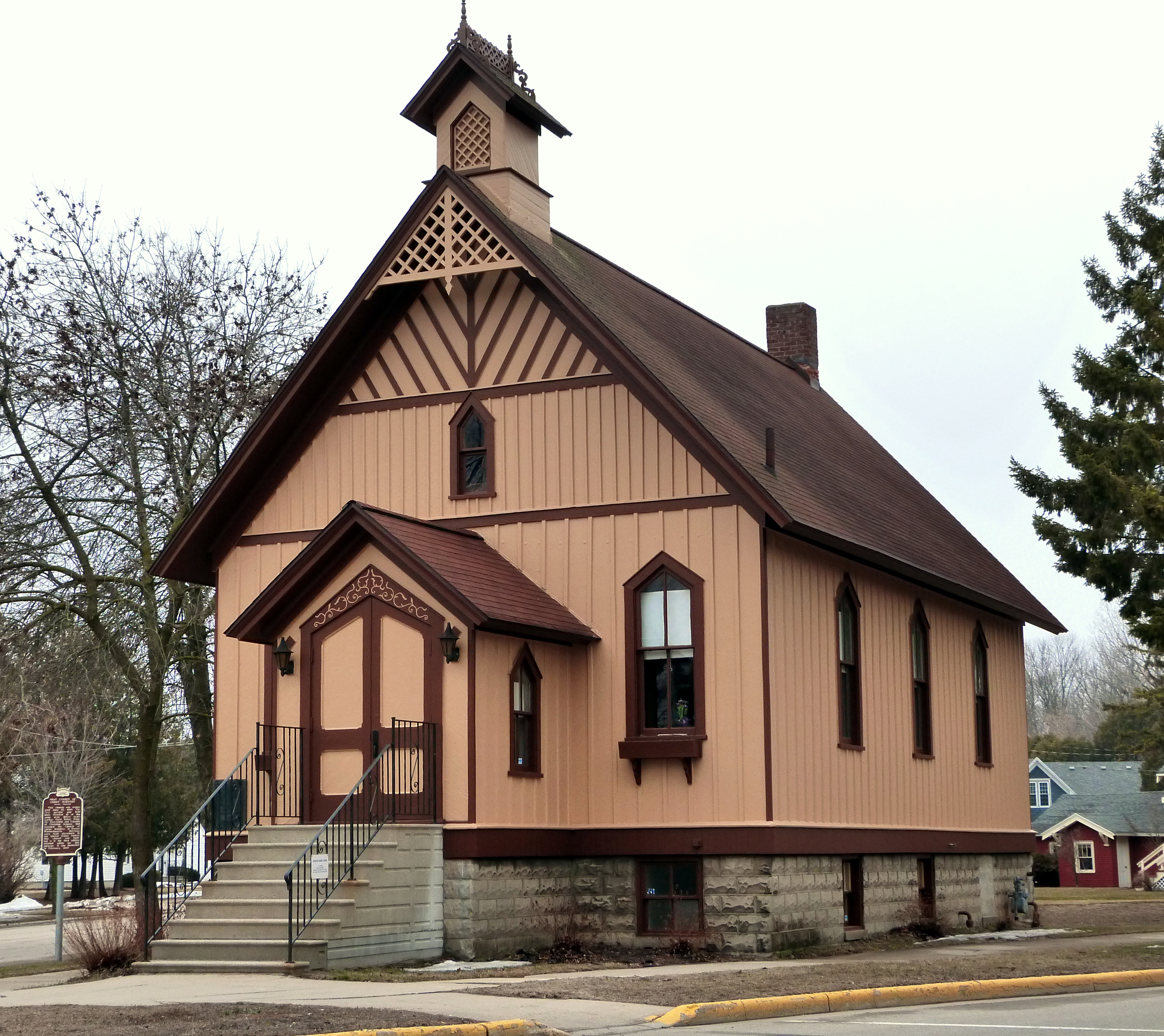
- The First Church of Christ, Scientist, in 2013

- Location within Wisconsin Location within the United States
- Location: 423 Chicago St., Oconto, Wisconsin
- Coordinates: 44°53′24″N 87°52′39″W
- Built: 1886
- NRHP reference No.: 74000111
- Added to NRHP: November 19, 1974

First Church of Christ, Scientist, also known as First Christian Science Church Edifice, is a church building located in Oconto, Wisconsin. Built in 1886 of stone, weatherboard and brick in the Gothic Revival style, it was the first purpose-built Christian Science church edifice in the world. It was added to the National Register of Historic Places in 1974.

== History ==
First Church of Christ, Scientist, Oconto, was organized on June 10, 1886, as "the Christian Science Association of Oconto," with the building being finished in October of that year for less than $1,000; but for various reasons it was not dedicated until February 1887. Other Christian Science groups were meeting at the time around the United States, and the membership of the Oconto church did not realize they had built the first Christian Science church edifice in the world until later. Laura Sargent and her sister Victoria, who were very involved in the founding of the church, would go on to play important roles in the movement.

== Current use ==
The building is still used for Christian Science religious services, although First Church of Christ, Scientist, Oconto, is now Christian Science Society, Oconto.

The auditorium seats 100 people.

== See also ==
- List of Former Christian Science Churches, Societies and Buildings
