= Brazeau, Wisconsin =

- Town
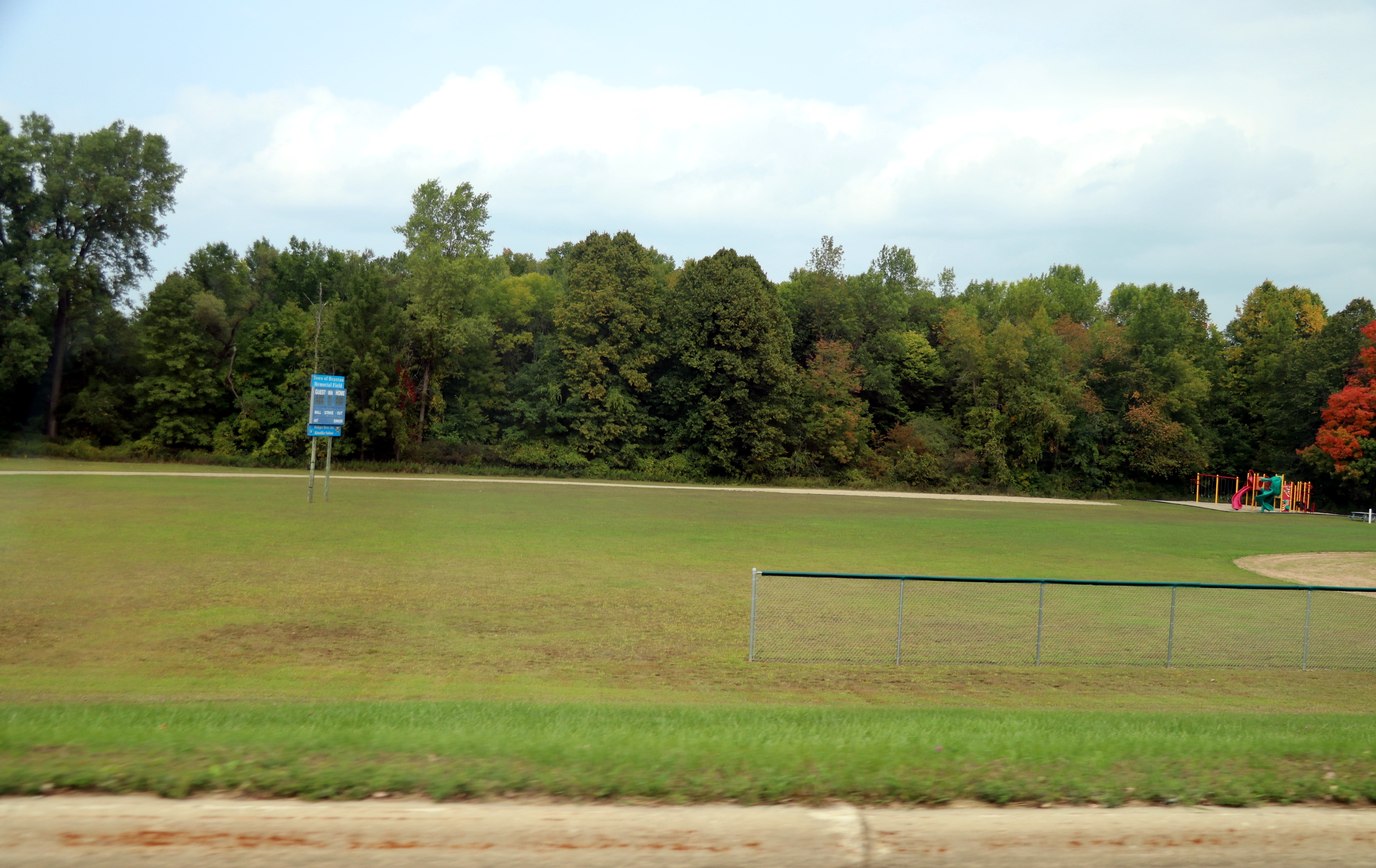
- Baseball Field for the Town of Brazeau

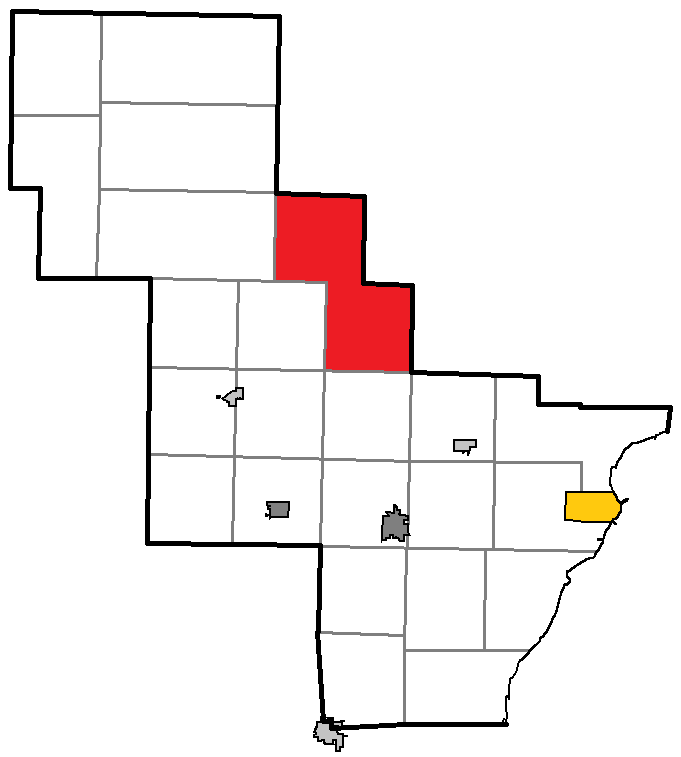
- Location of Brazeau, within Oconto County
- Coordinates: 45°6′31″N 88°12′39″W
- Country: United States
- State: Wisconsin
- County: Oconto

Area
  - Total: 71.5 sq mi (185.3 km^{2})
  - Land: 68.5 sq mi (177.5 km^{2})
  - Water: 3.0 sq mi (7.8 km^{2})
- Elevation: 879 ft (268 m)

Population (2020)
  - Total: 1,340
  - Density: 19.6/sq mi (7.55/km^{2})
- Time zone: UTC-6 (Central (CST))
  - Summer (DST): UTC-5 (CDT)
- FIPS code: 55-09375
- GNIS feature ID: 1582853

Brazeau is a town in Oconto County, Wisconsin, United States. The population was 1,340 at the 2020 census. The unincorporated community of Klondike is located in the town. The town was named for the Brazeau family, who were early settlers of Oconto County. The Brazeau family owned a substantial amount of land in the 1800s.

== Geography ==
According to the United States Census Bureau, the town has a total area of 71.6 square miles (185.3 km^{2}), of which 68.5 square miles (177.5 km^{2}) is land and 3.0 square miles (7.8 km^{2}) (4.22%) is water.

White Potato Lake is located in the northern part of the town.

== Demographics ==
At the 2000 census there were 1,408 people, 602 households, and 434 families in the town. The population density was 20.5 people per square mile (7.9/km^{2}). There were 1,347 housing units at an average density of 19.7 per square mile (7.6/km^{2}). The racial makeup of the town was 98.58% White, 0.07% African American, 0.14% Native American, 0.14% Asian, 0.28% from other races, and 0.78% from two or more races. Hispanic or Latino of any race were 0.99%.

Of the 602 households 22.9% had children under the age of 18 living with them, 63.6% were married couples living together, 4.0% had a female householder with no husband present, and 27.9% were non-families. 25.2% of households were one person and 13.0% were one person aged 65 or older. The average household size was 2.34 and the average family size was 2.76.

The age distribution was 21.4% under the age of 18, 4.9% from 18 to 24, 24.3% from 25 to 44, 26.8% from 45 to 64, and 22.6% 65 or older. The median age was 44 years. For every 100 females, there were 102.3 males. For every 100 females age 18 and over, there were 103.5 males.

The median household income was $34,750 and the median family income was $38,229. Males had a median income of $28,194 versus $19,276 for females. The per capita income for the town was $17,947. About 6.7% of families and 6.1% of the population were below the poverty line, including 7.3% of those under age 18 and 5.9% of those age 65 or over.
