= Old Copper complex =

North American archaeological culture (7500–1000 BCE)

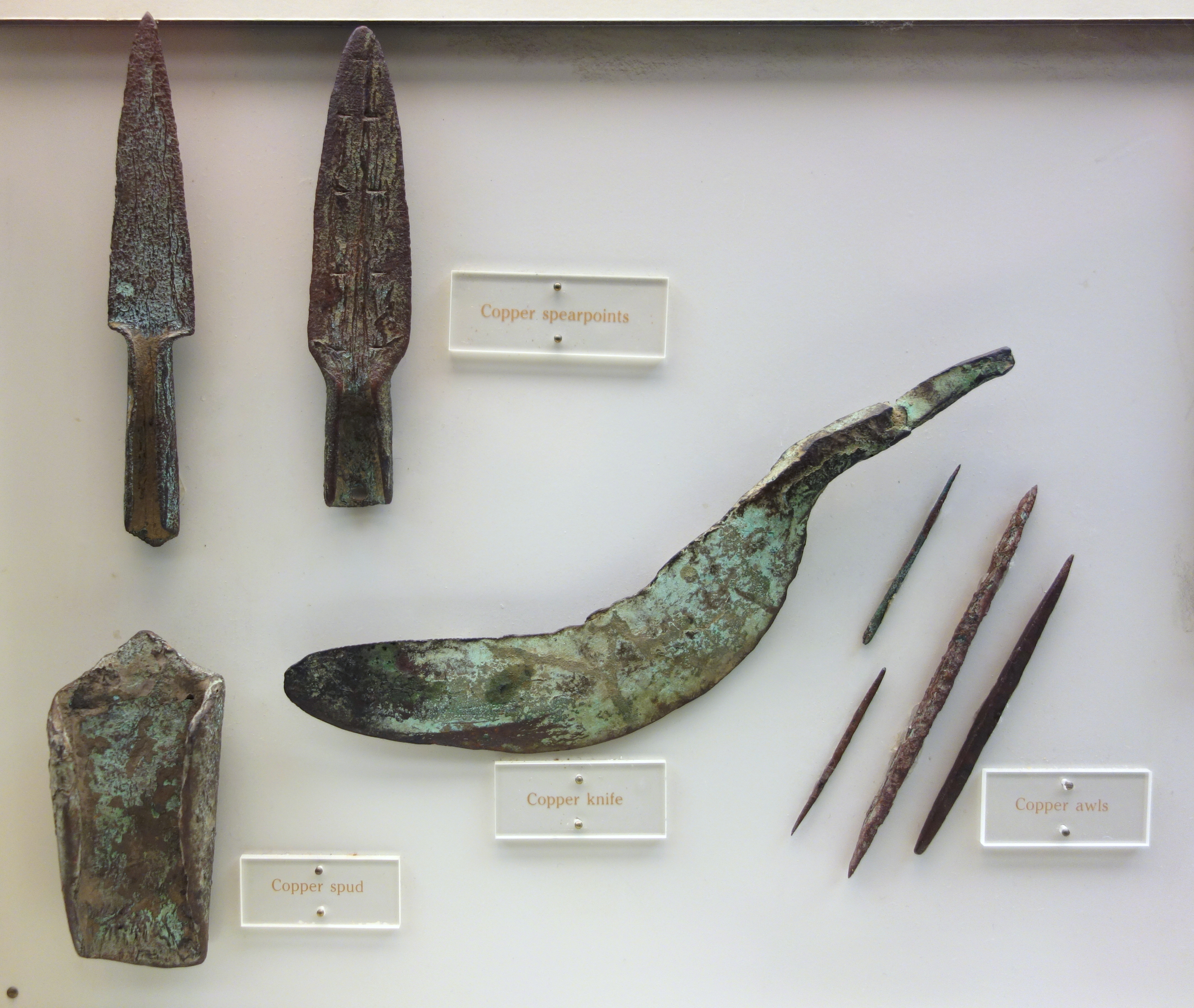
- Copper knife, spearpoints, awls, and spud (adze), from the Late Archaic period, Wisconsin, 3000 BC-1000 BCE.
- Geographical range: Great Lakes
- Period: Archaic
- Dates: 6500 – 1000 BCE
- Type site: Copper Culture State Park

The Old Copper complex or Old Copper culture is an archaeological culture from the Archaic period of North America's Great Lakes region. Artifacts from some of these sites have been dated from 6500 to 1580 BCE. It is characterized by widespread copper artifacts, including tools and weapons, as well as ornamental objects.

== Western Great Lakes ==
The Old Copper complex of the Western Great Lakes is the best known, and can be dated to around 6,500 BCE. Great Lakes natives of the Archaic period located 99% pure copper near Lake Superior, in veins touching the surface and in nuggets from gravel beds. Major quarries were located on Isle Royale, the Keweenaw Peninsula, and the Brule River, and copper was deposited elsewhere by glaciation as well.

By heating, annealing and hammering, these cultures worked the copper into shape and produced a variety of spearpoints, tools and decorative objects. In addition to their own use, the Copper Complex peoples traded copper goods for other exotic materials. By about 1,000 BCE, copper was increasingly restricted to jewelry and other status-related items, rather than tools. This is thought to represent the development of more complex social hierarchies in the area.

=== Oconto Site ===
The Copper Culture State Park, in Oconto, northeastern Wisconsin, contains an ancient burial ground called the Oconto Site used by the Old Copper complex culture between around 4,000 and 2,000 BCE. It was rediscovered in June 1952 by a 13-year-old boy who unearthed human bones while playing in an old gravel quarry. Upon receiving the news, Reuben La Fave and George Hall of the Oconto County Historical Society carried out test excavations, uncovering burials accompanied by copper artifacts. By July, Dr. Robert E. Ritzenthaler and Arthur Niehoffof the Milwaukee Public Museum began the first archaeological excavation as a part of a Wisconsin Archaeological Survey program.

45 individuals were excavated from pits within burial ground. The majority of the burials were flexed and bundle burials, and some held multiple individuals within a singular grave. 26 copper artifacts were recovered, among these being awls, crescents, clasps, a socketed-tang point, fishtail point, ovoid point, fish hook, bracelet, spiral coiled tubing, rivet, and a spatula.

== See also ==
- Metallurgy in pre-Columbian America
