= White Potato Lake =

Lake in the state of Wisconsin, United States

- Location within Wisconsin Location within the United States
- Location: Oconto County, Wisconsin
- Coordinates: 45.1442966°N 88.2106895°W
- Basin countries: United States
- Surface area: 1,023 acres (1.598 sq mi; 4.14 km^{2})
- Average depth: 5 ft (1.5 m)
- Max. depth: 11 ft (3.4 m)
- Water volume: 4,976.8 acre⋅ft (6,138,800 m^{3})
- Shore length^{1}: 6.25 mi (10.06 km)
- Surface elevation: 850 feet (260 m)
- ^{1} Shore length is not a well-defined measure.

White Potato Lake is a lake located in Oconto County, Wisconsin. It has a surface area of 1,023 acres (1.598 sq mi; 4.14 km^{2}) and a max depth of 11 ft (3.4 m). The lake is a seepage lake with a majority sand and muck bottom.

== See also ==
- List of lakes of Wisconsin
