= Henry Reynolds =

Henry Reynolds may refer to:

- Henry Reynolds (archaeologist) (died c. 1894), archaeologist in Georgia, US
- Henry Reynolds (cricketer) (1844–1894), English cricketer
- Henry Reynolds (historian) (born 1938), Australian historian
- Henry Reynolds (poet) (1564–1632), English poet and critic
- Henry Reynolds (VC) (1883–1948), English World War I recipient of the Victoria Cross
- Henry Chidley Reynolds (1849–1925), New Zealand farm manager, butter manufacturer and exporter
- Henry Edward Reynolds (1905–1980), mayor of Madison, Wisconsin
- Henry Revell Reynolds (1745–1811), English physician
- Henry Robert Reynolds (1825–1890), English minister and author

== See also ==
- Harry Reynolds (disambiguation)
