= Long-nosed god maskette =

Mississippian culture artifacts

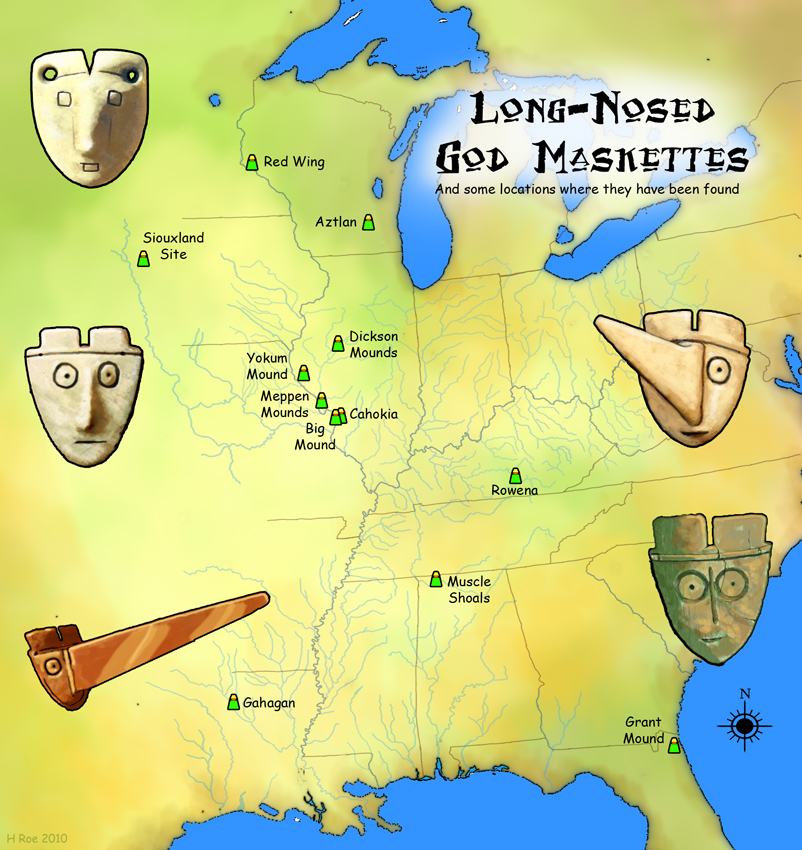
Map showing finds

Long-nosed god maskettes are artifacts made from bone, copper and marine shells (Lightning whelk) associated with the Mississippian culture (800 to 1600 CE) and found in archaeological sites in the Midwestern United States and the Southeastern United States. They are small shield-shaped faces with squared-off foreheads, circular eyes, and large noses of various lengths. They are often shown on Southeastern Ceremonial Complex representations of falcon impersonators as ear ornaments. Long and short nosed versions of the masks have been found in ten different states, with the majority found at sites in Illinois. Many archaeologists now associate them with the Ho-Chunk (Winnebago) stories of the mythological being Red Horn.

== Archaeology ==
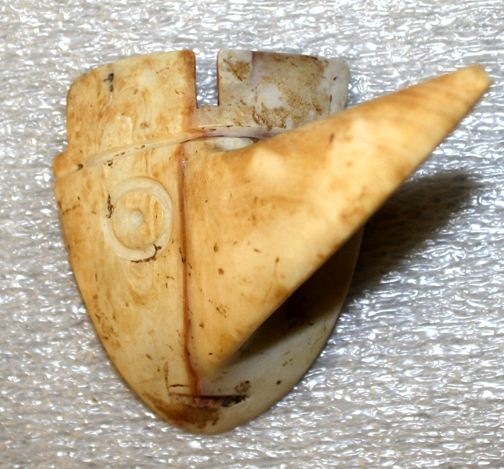
A Long-nosed god maskette excavated from the Yokem Mound Group in Pike County, Illinois, now in the N.M.A.I.

The first long nosed god maskette was found next to a skull in a grave in Big Mound in St. Louis in 1870. Since then over twenty of these artifacts have been discovered in an area encompassing at least ten states. They have also been found in Alabama, Arkansas, Florida, Iowa, Louisiana, Missouri, Oklahoma, Tennessee and Wisconsin, but the majority have been found in Illinois. Excavations at the Gahagan Mounds Site in Louisiana in 1939 produced a matched pair of copper maskettes. The largest examples yet found were a pair of copper masks dug from a mound in Calhoun County, Illinois by William G. Fecht. One is 22.4 centimetres (8.8 in) and the other 22 centimetres (8.7 in) in length. Clarence Bloomfield Moore found two copper examples when he excavated the St. Johns culture Grant Mound in Duval County, Florida in 1894 along with two biconical copper covered ear-spools similar to ones from Cahokia.

=== Long nosed god horizon ===
Archaeologists have long used the maskettes for dating different phases of the Mississippian culture. In the 1950s Stephen Williams and John Mann Goggin proposed the existence of an early Mississippian Long nosed god horizon based on the distribution and chronological positioning of the finds. In 1989 Jon Muller of Southern Illinois University proposed reorganizing the classification of the Southeastern Ceremonial Complex into five horizons, with each as a discrete tradition defined by the origin of specific motifs and ritual objects. The first horizon he defines for his Mississippian Ideological Interaction Sphere is the Developmental Cult Period which went from 900 to 1150 CE and is marked by the appearance of the Long nosed god maskettes.

== Theories about uses ==
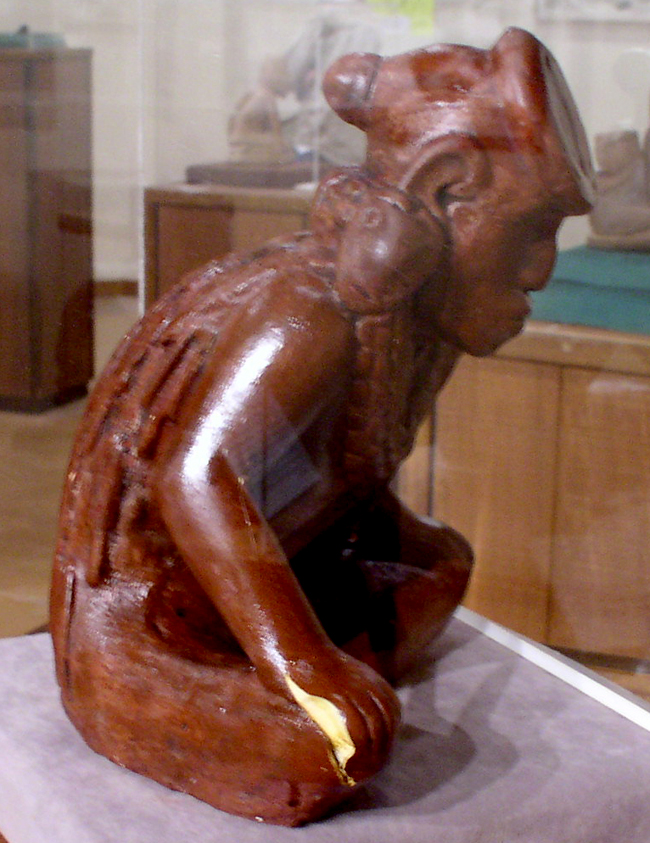
"Resting Warrior" from Spiro with short nosed god maskette earring

The long-nosed god maskettes may have functioned in the Early Mississippian Period of the eastern United States within an adoption ritual much like that of the Calumet ceremony of the historic period.----to create fictions of kinship between the powerful leader of a large polity and his political clients in outlying areas.

— - Timothy R. Pauketat 2004

Some archaeologists, including James B. Griffin of the Smithsonian Institution, at first believed that the Long-nosed god masks were evidence of contact with Mesoamerica. They identified the masks as possible representations of the Aztec deity Yacatecuhtli, an aspect of Quetzalcoatl whose name means “The Lord Who Guides”. Yacatecuhtli was worshipped by the pochteca, a class of professional long-distance traveling merchants. In the 1990s anthropologist Robert L. Hall proposed that the maskettes were used by Mississippian peoples as part of ritual adoptions in which important leaders extended fictive kinship to visiting leaders in order to cement political alliances and trade relationships. Hall, an expert on Native American belief systems, theorised that the maskettes were used to identify individuals involved in the adoption rituals with the figures of Red Horn (who was also known as "He-Who-Wears-Human-Heads-As-Earrings") and his sons. Many of the myths of Red Horn and his sons, found amongst the Chiwere Siouan-speaking people including the Ho-Chunk and Ioway, involve instances of kinship and adoption. In his guise as "He who Gets Hit with Deer Lungs", Red Horn is also associated with the Calumet ceremony, which is another fictive kinship/adoption ritual. The differing shapes of the noses found on earpieces, including long, bent and short varieties, are explained by the myths as differing stages of the ritualized adoption process. In one Caddoan myth, the "wild brother" of the Hero Twins possesses a long nose which is magically shortened by a medicine man. This has led some researchers to think the masks start as the long nosed variety, denoting the first stage in the initiation process. As the individual progresses through the rituals, the nose is symbolically bent and eventually trimmed in the final phase, denoting full acceptance into the kinship system.

== See also ==
- Mississippian copper plates
- Mississippian culture pottery
- Mississippian stone statuary
- Shell gorget
- Visual arts by indigenous peoples of the Americas
