= Mill Cove Complex =

Mill Cove Complex Grant Mound (8DU14) and Shields Mound (8BR12)
- Location within Florida today
- 30°22′21.68″N 81°34′8.4″W
- Cultures: St. Johns culture
- Location: Jacksonville, Florida, Duval County, Florida, US
- Region: Duval County, Florida

Site notes
- Architectural style: Burial mound
- Excavation dates: 1894, 1895, 1999–2002
- Archaeologists: Clarence Bloomfield Moore

The Mill Cove Complex is a group of prehistoric archaeological sites located in Duval County, Florida built by people of the St. Johns culture approximately 900 to 1250 CE. The site encompasses two sand mounds, Grant Mound (8DU14) and the contemporaneous Shields Mound (8DU12) located 750 metres (0.47 mi) away, and an area in between the two which is full of St. Johns culture midden deposits.

== Shields Mound ==
The mound is a mortuary structure first excavated in 1894 and 1895 by Clarence Bloomfield Moore (C. B. Moore). At the time Moore described the mound as being a slightly oblong shaped rectangular platform mound 65.2 metres (214 ft) in diameter and 5.5 metres (18 ft) in height with a summit measuring 40.5 metres (133 ft) by 35.1 metres (115 ft). There was a ramp running to the top on the north face that measured 38.2 metres (125 ft) in length by 26.7 metres (88 ft) wide. Later archaeological work in 1999-2002 determined that the mound is a burial mound and not a substructure platform mound with burials as Moore assumed. Moore found a number of exotic grave goods in the mound, including copper artifacts and several spatulate celts similar to ones found in Mississippian culture sites in other parts of the southeastern US and generally seen as elite status symbols. He also found one copper plate similar to others he'd found when he excavated the Grant Mound and Mount Royal Mound, another nearby St. Johns culture sites.

== Grant Mound ==
In 1894 C. B. Moore described the mound as being a truncated cone mound 8.1 metres (27 ft) in height, with a base diameter of 65.8 metres (216 ft) a summit diameter of 7.3 metres (24 ft). When he excavated the mound he found a large number of graves and many artifacts, although all of the artifacts do not seem to be associated with burials as grave goods. The artifacts were of both local and nonlocal manufacture and included 147 polished stone celts, chipped stone tools, soapstone smoking pipes, shell drinking cups of the type used for the black drink ritual, bone pins, pottery and a variety of items made from or covered with copper. The copper items included embossed plaques, beads, two bi-conical ear spools and two long-nosed god maskettes. Both the copper covered earspools and long-nosed god maskettes are rare items that have associations with the Cahokia site in western Illinois and the Southeastern Ceremonial Complex.

== Trade ==
The presence of exotic copper items in the two mounds along with busycon shells has led archaeologists to believe the peoples of the Mill Cove Complex were involved in long distance trade with Mississippian culture peoples to their west. Whelk shells and yaupon holly, two local products, were valuable elite commodities to the peoples of the Mississippian cultures, used to make shell gorgets, ritual drinking vessels, beads and columnella pendants and the ingredient for the black drink.

== See also ==
- Turtle Mound
- Fort Walton culture
