= Underwater panther =

Legendary creature in Indigenous folklore

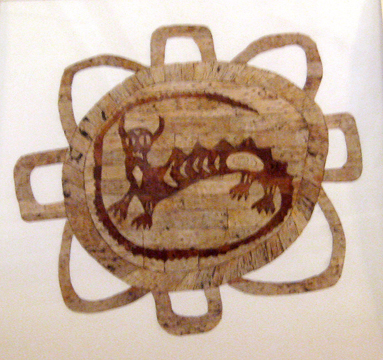
Underwater Panther, George Gustav Heye Center, National Museum of the American Indian

An underwater panther (Ojibwe: Mishipeshu (syllabic: ᒥᔑᐯᔓ) or Mishibizhiw (ᒥᔑᐱᒋᐤ) [mɪʃʃɪbɪʑɪw]), is one of the most important of several mythical water beings among many Indigenous peoples of the Northeastern Woodlands and Great Lakes region, particularly among the Anishinaabeg.

Mishipeshu translates into "the Great Lynx". It has the head and paws of a giant cat but is covered in scales and has dagger-like spikes running along its back and tail. Mishipeshu calls Michipicoten Island in Lake Superior its home and is a powerful creature in the mythological traditions of some Indigenous North American tribes, particularly Anishinaabe, the Odawa, Ojibwe, and Potawatomi, of the Great Lakes region of Canada and the United States. In addition to the Anishinaabeg, Innu also have Mishibizhiw stories.

To the Algonquins, the underwater panther was the most powerful underworld being. The Ojibwe traditionally held them to be masters of all water creatures, including snakes. Some versions of the Nanabozho creation legend refers to whole communities of water lynx.

Some archaeologists believe that underwater panthers were major components of the Southeastern Ceremonial Complex of the Mississippian culture in the prehistoric American Southeast.

== Name ==
In the Ojibwe language, this creature is sometimes called Mishibizhiw, Mishipizhiw, Mishipizheu, Mishupishu, Mishepishu, Michipeshu, Mishebeshu, or Mishibijiw, which translates as "Great Lynx", or Gichi-anami'e-bizhiw ("Gitche-anahmi-bezheu"), which translates as "the fabulous night panther". However, it is also commonly referred to as the "Great underground wildcat" or "Great under-water wildcat". It is the most important of the underwater animals for the Ojibwa.

Other sources describe instead the deity in terms of the "underwater manito" (Note: Also styled "underwater manidoog".), as a composite of the "underwater lion" and the "horned serpent".

== Description ==
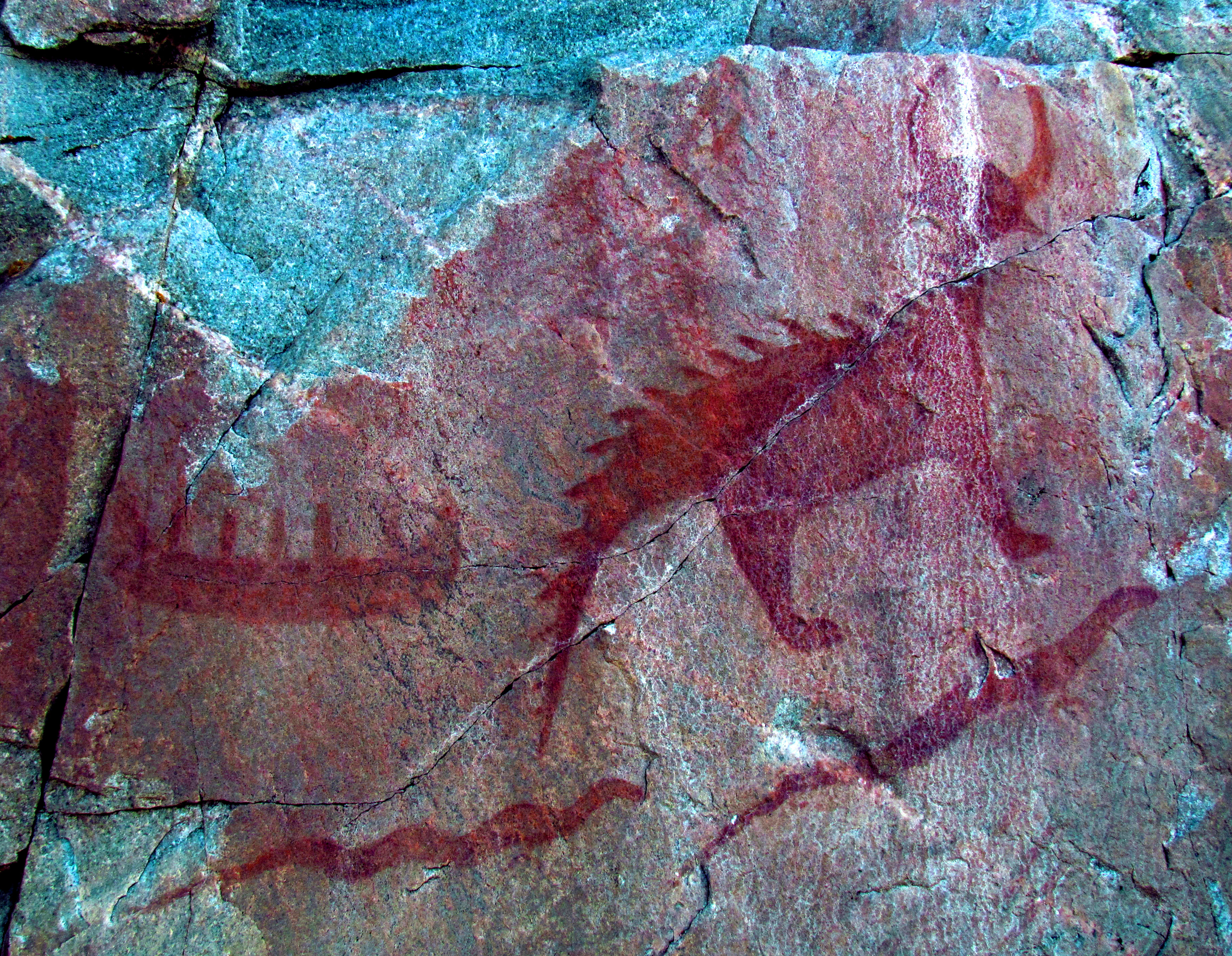
Pictographs of a mishibizhiw as well as two giant serpents and a canoe, from Lake Superior Provincial Park, Ontario, Canada. Attributed to the Ojibwe.

In mythologies of the indigenous peoples of the Great Lakes, underwater panthers are described as water monsters that live in opposition to the thunderbirds, masters of the powers of the air. Underwater Panthers are seen as an opposing yet complementary force to the Thunderbirds, and they are engaged in eternal conflict.

The underwater panther is an amalgam of parts from many animals: the body of a wild feline, often a cougar or lynx; the horns of deer or bison; upright scales on its back; occasionally feathers; and parts from other animals as well, depending on the particular myth. Underwater panthers are represented with exceptionally long tails, occasionally with serpentine properties.

Mishipizheu are said to live in the deepest parts of lakes and rivers, where they can cause storms or squalls and rapids, i.e., shift the direction and force of currents, sink canoes, and drown people, often children. The creatures are thought to roar or hiss in the sounds of storms or rushing rapids.

Some traditions believed the underwater panthers could be helpful, protective creatures; for example, they were believed to shelter and feed those who fell through the winter ice. The water manito (water panther and serpent) endowed medicinal power to those (shamans) who accepted its guardianship. (Note: Radin c. 1926, no pagination, cited by Vecsey.) (Note: Smith (1995), p. 109 apud Lankford) It made gifts of copper — that is to say, the Ojibwe believed such rock formation partly submerged in water with copper lode protrusions to be a divinity, which would allow passersby to cut off copper from "its horns". (Note: Kellogg (1917), p. 105, cited by Vecsey.)

But more often they were viewed as malevolent beasts that brought death and misfortune. They often need to be placated for safe passage across a lake. As late as the 1950s, the Prairie Band of Potawatomi Indians performed a traditional ceremony to placate the Underwater Panther and maintain balance with the Thunderbird.

When ethnographer Johann Georg Kohl visited the United States in the 1850s, he spoke with a Fond du Lac chief who showed Kohl a piece of copper kept in his medicine bag. The chief said it was a strand of hair from the mishibizhiw, and thus considered extremely powerful.

== Copper ==
Mishipeshu is known for guarding the vast amounts of copper in Lake Superior and the Great Lakes Region. Indigenous people mined copper long before the arrival of Europeans to the area. Later, during the 17th century, missionaries of the Society of Jesus arrived in the Great Lakes Region. By that time, taking copper from the region was extremely taboo and forbidden by the Ojibwe tribe. It was even worse to take it from the Great Lynx's home, Michipicoten Island; this was considered to be stealing from Mishipeshu herself.

== Purported encounters ==
There are a few stories of encounters with this great beast. A Jesuit missionary named Claude Dablon told a story about four Ojibwe people who embarked on a journey to the home of Mishipeshu to take some copper back to their home, and use it to heat water. The very second they pushed off and backed into the water with their canoe, the eerie voice of the water panther surrounded them. The water panther came growling after them, vigorously accusing them of stealing the playthings of her children. All four of the people died on the way back to their village, the last one surviving just long enough to tell the tale of what had happened in his final moments before he died.

== Iconography ==
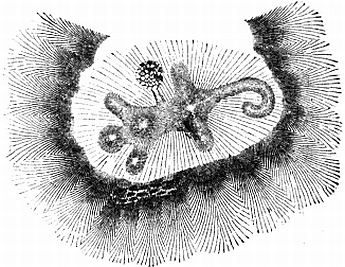
Alligator Effigy Mound.

The underwater panther is well represented in pictograms. Historical Anishnaabe twined and quilled men's bags often feature an underwater panther on one panel and the Thunderbird on the other.

The Alligator Effigy Mound (cf. fig. right) in Granville, Ohio has been hypothesized as depicting an underwater panther by archaeologist Brad Lepper (2003). Lepper posits that early European settlers, when learning from Native Americans that the mound represented a fierce creature that lived in the water and ate people, mistakenly assumed that the Native Americans were referring to an alligator.

Late 18th and 19th century dragon-motif side plates were attached to muskets manufactured at York Factory in Canada, and these dragons were evidently associated with the water panther or "mishipizheu" by the natives.

Modern-day artist Norval Morrisseau (Ojibwe) has painted underwater panthers in his Woodlands style artworks, contemporary paintings based on Ojibwe oral history and cosmology. In the crayon drawing of his early years, he has represented the michipichou naturalistically, giving it brown color and giving lifelike details to its whiskers and horns, bound by the conventions of popular illustrations, but in the early 1960s, he produced Untitled (michipichou) and Water Spirit, which drew from ancient rock art, and rendered in bold strokes.

The Canadian Museum of History includes an underwater panther in its coat of arms.

== Other Native Cultures ==
The title of Underwater Panther was ported over onto a wide range of other similar mythological creatures and deities believed in by several Native cultures in the Eastern US.

=== Iroquoian ===
The Iroquois Underwater Panther is known by several names. It is usually depicted as a serpentine dragon with four clawed feet, a horse like mane of hair, a long tail, copper deer antlers and an uncut diamond in its forehead. Such jewels are treated as sacred relics and believed to hold fantastic power as a totem, with many claims tribes had them before the teachings of Tecumseh's brother, Tenskwatawa, convinced many eastern tribes to give up medicine ceremonies and throw away medicine bundles associated with them.

They live in the Great Lakes, usually associated with dangerous areas of coast, like certain coves, coastal caves and swampy islands. They were said to have some power to create storms. The Iroquois were known to sacrifice dogs and tobacco when passing their homes via Canoe by throwing them overboard to avoid their wrath. It is believed they also have some shapeshifting ability, leading some to conclude that the Horned Serpent and Comet Lion of other Iroquoian stories are also the same mythological creature. Other known names include Blue Panther, Blue Snake and Oiare. The Erie tribe, known as the Cat People and the Long Tail People likely took their name from this spirit. It's also possible that it is the "panther" held on a leash by the Wind spirit, Geha, which represents one of the four winds, alongside three other animals.

=== Ho-chunk ===
In the Midwest, the Underwater Panther is known to the Potawatomi and the Menominee. Its equivalent is the horned Water Spirit of the Ho-chunk aka Winnebago. The thunderbird, bear spirit, and water clans are the three most significant clans of the Ho-chunk Paul Radin's research. Each clan has correspondence to effigy mounds according to Robert L. Hall, and the water spirit is common in the effigy mounds of Wisconsin (cf. Alligator Effigy Mound under § Alligator Effigy Mound above). The Baraboo Hills of Wisconsin resulted, according to legend, from a war between the thunderbirds and water spirits. In Ho-chunk (Winnebago) cosmogony, the water spirit dwelling at the center of the earth sometimes displaces the Hare spirit, grandson of Earthmaker as ruler of the whole earth.

This Water Spirit shares power over medicine with a Buffalo spirit and taught the shamans of the Ho-Chunk how to kill evil spirits with weapons carved from Red Cedar, a trope that seems to also exist amongst some nearby Algonquian tribes, whose legends add the further instruction of attacking such monsters in their shadow.

=== Lakota ===
The Lakota do not consider Underwater Panther a god or spirit, but a monster translated as Underwater Panther by the writers does come up in some of their stories. Here, it is a giant wildcat with ridges down its spine and a single, giant eye that lives on an island, attacking those who pass too closely.

However, some of the associations likely passed on to a serpentine race of earth spirits honored in their culture called the Uŋkcegila. These are subterranean beings who are fickle and the enemies of the Thunderbirds. Meanwhile, the sacred Buffalo and Water Spirit of the Ho-Chunk seems to have become two Buffalo and bear for the Lakota.

=== Cherokee ===
The Cherokee also speak of the True Lynx in their myths, which bears a lot of similarity to the Algonquian one, as a giant bobcat with a long tail and a human face, though it serves a different role in their mythology than the Underwater Panther of the north. Likewise to the Lakota, they also believe in Uktena, which combines elements of the Uŋkcegila and the Iroquoian Underwater Panther/ Horned Serpent.

== See also ==
- Anishinaabe traditional beliefs
- List of lake monsters- many Lake monster myths, including Champ and Bessie, are inspired by the Underwater Panther.
- Agoa- Known in West Virginia, along the Monongahela River, is a story of a man eating turtle monster that lives in a swampy area of river Bank. While largely dissimilar, the name, Agoa, was taken from early bad renderings of the Lenape word for a type of snake, given as Ashgook. Most likely, it was attempting to render the word for the Green Snake, specifically- askask xkuk, xkuk being their actual word for snake. Early settlers probably picked up on the Lenape belief that an Underwater Panther lived there and a name, but didn't know what it was, so made up a new monster themselves.
- Hodag – Mythical creature from American folklore
- Nguruvilu – Mythical fox-serpent of Mapuche myth
- Piasa- the legend of the Piasa, though mostly ripping off the Thunderbird, was based on a mural of an Underwater Panther created on a cliff overlooking the Mississippi River by the Illinois tribe.
- Horned Serpent
- Wampus cat - has nearly identical backstory to many of the Underwater Panther stories, though the name has confused researchers. Said to be from Cherokee lore, however no analogue to the word Wampus exists in Cherokee language.
- Southeastern Ceremonial Complex
- Bunyip – Mythical creature from Aboriginal mythology
- Shuihu - Water tiger from East Asian folklore.
