= Gahagan Mounds Site =

Archaeological site in Louisiana, United States

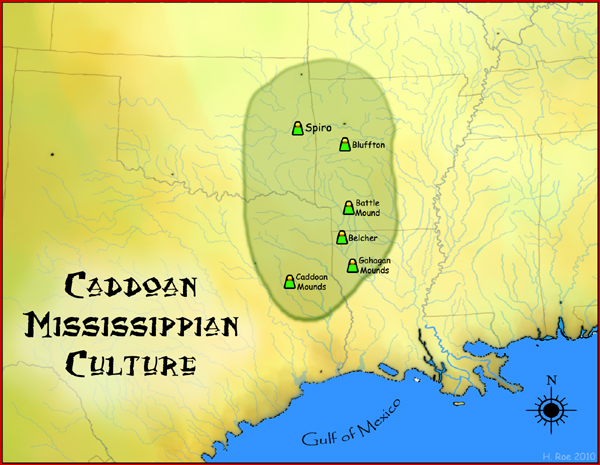
- Map of the Caddoan Mississippian culture and some important sites, including the Gahagan Mound Site

- Location within Louisiana today
- 32°2′25″N 93°24′19″W
- Cultures: Caddoan Mississippian culture
- Location: Harmon, Louisiana, Red River Parish, Louisiana, US
- Region: Red River Parish, Louisiana

History
- Built: 900 CE

Site notes
- Architectural styles: Platform mounds, Burial mound, Plaza
- Excavation dates: 1912, 1939,
- Archaeologists: Clarence Bloomfield Moore, Clarence H. Webb

The Gahagan Mounds Site (16RR1) is an Early Caddoan Mississippian culture archaeological site in Red River Parish, Louisiana. It is located in the Red River Valley. The site is famous for the three shaft burials and exotic grave goods excavated there in the early twentieth century.

== Site description ==
The Gahagan Site is located on the western side of the Red River, about halfway between Natchitoches and Shreveport. It was once located on an old river channel, but much of the site has been destroyed by the meandering of the river. The site was occupied between 900 and 1200 CE. It consisted of a platform mound, a cone shaped burial mound, and a habitation area surrounding a centrally located plaza, with another small mound located about a quarter mile away.

== Excavations ==
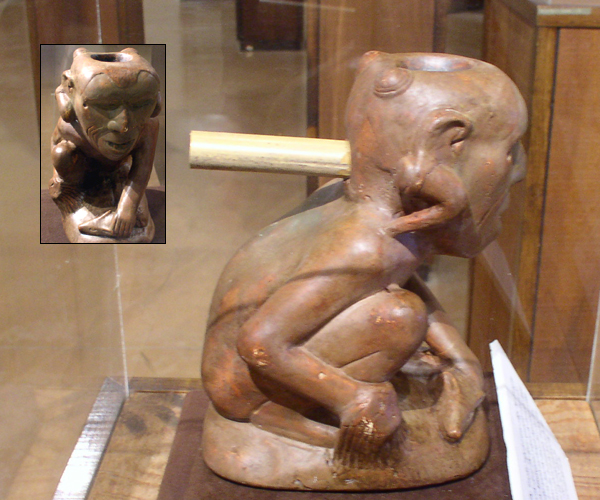
A Missouri flint clay effigy pipe from the Spiro site, similar to those found at Gahagan

The burial mound at the site has been excavated twice, in 1912 by Clarence Bloomfield Moore and in 1939 by Clarence H. Webb. Between the two excavations, three burial shafts with a total of fourteen burials and more than five hundred grave goods were discovered. The first shaft, found by Moore, was 11 feet (3.4 m) in depth and 13 feet (4.0 m) by 8 feet (2.4 m) in width and height. The other two, found in the 1939 excavations, were 19 feet (5.8 m) by 15 feet (4.6 m) and 12 feet (3.7 m) by 11 feet (3.4 m) in dimensions. The grave goods found during the excavations included intricately flaked flint knives, known since as Gahagan blades, a matched pair of long-nosed god maskette earrings made of sheet copper, Missouri flint clay statues and pipes, copper ear ornaments, embossed copper plates, greenstone celts and spuds, and caches of beads and arrow heads. Many of the grave goods were exotic imports from such distant places as the Gulf Coast, the Central Texas plateau, Tennessee, Kentucky, and the Great Lakes, and may be indicative of involvement in continent wide trade and religious networks such as the Southeastern Ceremonial Complex. Many of the disinterred remains and grave goods were donated to Louisiana State University Museum of Natural Science by the Peabody Museum of Archaeology and Ethnology at Harvard University, and few more later by Dr. Webb.

=== Gahagan blades ===
The burial offerings at Gahagan contained particularly beautifully flaked stone knives which have since become known as Gahagan blades. The knives have been found at other Caddoan sites, including the Caddoan Mounds State Historic Site, but are thought to originate to the west of the Caddo territory in central Texas. They were made from chert from this area and archaeologists believe they were produced as a trade export by groups there.

== See also ==
- Spiro Mounds
- List of Mississippian sites
- Mississippian stone statuary
