= Harry Reynolds =

Harry Reynolds may refer to:

- Harry Reynolds (EastEnders), fictional character
- Harry Reynolds (Home and Away), fictional character
- Butch Reynolds (born 1964), American 400 meters sprinter
- Harry Reynolds (cyclist) (1874–1940), Irish cyclist
- Harry Reynolds (ice hockey) (1892–1977), Canadian ice hockey player
- Harry Reynolds (film editor), editor on the film Four Walls
- Robert Smith (Medal of Honor) (born Harry Reynolds, 1847–1930), American soldier and Medal of Honor recipient
- Harry Reynolds, lead vocalist for English experimental rock band Classically Handsome Brutes
- Harry Reynolds (Australian footballer), Australian football player

== See also ==
- Henry Reynolds (disambiguation)
- Harold Reynolds (disambiguation)
