= Red Horn =

Chiwere culture hero

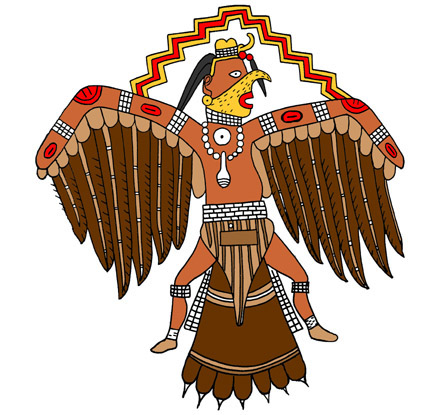
An artist’s reconstruction of a Mississippian era depiction of what archeologists and historians believe to be Redhorn or possibly someone dressing up as Redhorn for a ceremony.

Red Horn is a culture hero in oral traditions, specifically of the Iowa and Hocąk (Winnebago) nations.

He has different names. Only in Hocąk literature is he known as "Red Horn" (Hešucka), but among the Ioway and Hocągara both, he is known by one of his variant names, "He Who Wears (Man) Faces on His Ears". This name derives from the living faces on his earlobes (Hocąk), or earbobs that come to life when he places them on his ears (Ioway). Elsewhere, he is given yet another name, "Red Man" (Wąkšucka), because his entire body is red from head to toe.

Red Horn was one of the five sons of Earthmaker, whom the Creator fashioned with his own hands and sent to earth to rescue humanity. During his sojourn on earth, he contested both giants and water spirits, and led war parties against the bad spirits who plagued humanity. As Wears Faces on His Ears, he is also said to be a star, although its identity is a subject of controversy. Under the names "One Horn" (Hejąkiga) and "Without Horns" (Herok'aga), he and his sons are chiefs over the small hunting spirits known as the herok'a and the "little children spirits". Red Horn, as chief of the herok'a, has a spiritual and sometimes corporeal identity with the arrow. Archaeologists have speculated that Red Horn is a mythic figure in Mississippian art, represented on a number of Southeastern Ceremonial Complex (SECC) artifacts.

== The son of Earthmaker ==
According to legend, Red Horn is one of the five great soteriological spirits fashioned by the Creator's own hands, sent to earth to make the world safe for the least endowed of Earthmaker's creation, the "two-legged walkers". The first spirit to be sent down to earth to help humanity was Trickster (Wakdjąkaga), whose foolishness made it necessary to recall him. Earthmaker next sent down Bladder (Wadexuga), whose arrogance led to the loss of all but one of his 20 brothers, so he too was recalled. Then Earthmaker made Turtle (Kecągega) and charged him to teach the humans how to live, but Turtle brought them war, and was in his turn recalled. The fifth and last of these heroes dispatched by Earthmaker was Hare (Wacdjįgega), who conquered all the bad spirits who had preyed on humanity. By accident, however, he introduced death, but made up for it by creating the Medicine Lodge, by whose discipline members could achieve immortality. Earthmaker made Hare in charge of this earth, and to each of the other three spirits he gave an otherworldly paradise to govern. The penultimate savior figure in this series was Redhorn. He had quite nearly succeeded, but was killed in a wrestling match with the enemies of the human race. Although later revived, he too was recalled, although the reasons for his failure are obscure. One source suggests that it was a lack of gravitas.

Then Earthmaker (Mą'ųna) sent down another son, He who Wears Human Heads as Earrings. He went around talking to people, but they would always fix on his earrings which were actual, living, miniature human heads. When these little heads saw someone looking at them, they would wink and make funny faces. In the end, He who Wears Human Heads as Earrings could not accomplish the mission either.

Unlike all the other soteriological spirits, Red Horn is not assigned a paradise over which to rule; and the Medicine Rite omits any mention of Red Horn from its account of the sons of Earthmaker. These facts indicate that Red Horn may have been a recent addition to the role. Meeker even suggested that a certain notable Piegan contemporary of the same name may have simply been elevated to divine status. More recently, Lankford held a similar view: "... Red Horn was a recent addition to the Winnebago pantheon diffused possibly from the Blackfoot tribe."

== Red Horn's adventures ==
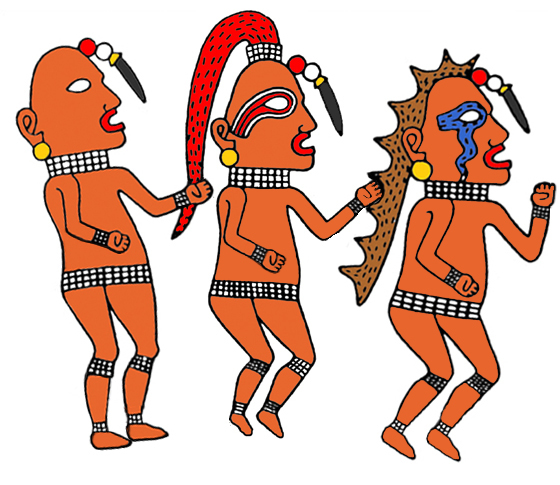
A contemporary painting of Turtle, Red Horn and Storms as He Walks done in the style of a Southeastern Ceremonial Complex engraved whelk shell.

The adventures of Red Horn are set out in a set of stories known as the "Red Horn Cycle". The Red Horn Cycle depicts his adventures with Turtle, the thunderbird Storms-as-He-Walks (Mą'e-manįga) and others who contest a race of giants, the Wąge-rucge or "Man-Eaters", who have been killing human beings whom Red Horn has pledged to help. In the episode associated with this name, Red Horn turns himself into an arrow to win a race. After winning the race Red Horn creates heads on his earlobes and makes his hair into a long red braid called a he, "horn", in Hocąk. Thus he becomes known as "Red-horn" (he-šucka) and as "He who Wears (Human) Faces on His Ears" (įco-horúšika).

In one episode an orphan girl who always wears a white beaverskin wrap is pressured by her grandmother to court Red Horn. Despite the orphan's adamant refusal, the grandmother insists. The orphan eventually relents and goes off to find Red Horn, who is surrounded by other girls. She teases him, and unexpectedly, he smiles at her. The other girls are jealous; they push and shove the orphan and tell her "You don't know anything." Red Horn and his friends prepare to go on the warpath and are camped just outside the village. During this time the women bring to the warriors moccasins and the orphan brings a pair to Red Horn, who accepts them. When the warriors return from battle, they play a prank and have the sentries proclaim that Red Horn and one of his friends are dead. The grandmother begins to cut the hair of the orphan, as if she were already Red Horn's wife. When he comes into view and it is apparent that he is not dead, the grandmother laments "I have wrecked my granddaughter's hair." The victors dance for four days, and many of the young men approach Red Horn to recommend their sisters to him. He takes no interest, and asks instead, "Where does the girl in the white beaverskin wrap live?" At night Red Horn shows up at the orphan's lodge and lies down next to her. Her grandmother throws a blanket over them and they are married. In another episode, with their lives staked on the outcome, the giants challenge Red Horn and his friends to play kisik (lacrosse). The best player among the giants was a woman with long red hair just like Red Horn's. The little heads on Red Horn's ears caused her to laugh so much that it interfered with her game and the giants lost, but Red Horn married the woman with the red hair. The giants lost all the other contests as well. Then they challenged Red Horn and his friends to a wrestling match in which they threw all but Red Horn's friend Turtle. Since Red Horn and his fellow spirits lost two out of the three matches, they were all slain.

== Red Horn as a star ==
There is a little-known myth of great importance that identifies Red Horn as a star. Ten brothers lived together in a longhouse. The eldest, Kunu, had four arms. The youngest brother was called "Wears Faces on His Ears" (įcohorúšika), because he had living human faces on each of his ears. By dancing all night and performing the hunting rite by which game is seduced, they were able to gain wives for themselves. However, the second brother, Hena, was jealous because his youngest brother had gotten the fattest woman (hinųk šį), so he persuaded his other brothers, all except Kunu and the next youngest, to join him in a plot to rid themselves of Wears Faces on His Ears. They brought him to the lodge of a beautiful woman who in reality was a water spirit (wakcexi). She persuaded him to go to the back of her lodge, where he fell through a trap door into the underworld. There he was made captive by the bad water spirits (wakcexi šišik). Loon and Otter were the nephews of the water spirits. Each made an impassioned plea to free the young man, but the bad water spirits were determined to eat him, so Loon and Otter left the underworld for the earth where they have lived ever after. Wears Faces on His Ears broke his chains as though they were made of string, then grabbed a fire brand and began to club the water spirits to death and to set their realm aflame. He tracked down the woman who had tricked him and chased her through the underworld, where she tried to hide as a tubercle on a weed. Just the same, he found her out and killed her. When he returned to earth, he discovered that in his absence the rebel brothers had abused his two loyal brothers. The disloyal brothers had in reality been foxes and coyotes. When Wears Faces on His Ears struck Hena with his club, he was transformed into a fox. Thus, the wicked brothers lived as animals thereafter. Wears Faces on His Ears and his two loyal brothers were stars.

Without any reference to this story, much has been said about the stellar identity of Red Horn. In 1945, many years after his field work, Paul Radin suggested that Red Horn might be identical to the Morning Star (of Venus), known to the Hocągara as Wiragošge Xetera, "the Great Star". Most archaeologists have accepted this suggestion. However, just three years later, he was less certain, saying only that Red Horn was "either evening- or morning-star", and in 1954 he changed his position yet again, asserting that Red Horn, "probably is identical with the Evening Star". After an extensive discussion of the problem, Lankford summed up by saying, "It appears that the safest conclusion for this study of Morning Star traditions is to accept the Winnebago divinities [Red Horn, Blue Horn, the Twins] as possibly stellar figures but to allow them to remain without a celestial name, insofar as ethnoastronomy is concerned." Nevertheless, the very end of our story identifies Red Horn, in his form as Wears Faces on His Ears, as a fixed star, probably Alnilam of Orion.

"The one star that is shining most greatly of the trio, it is he. The greatly shining white one, and the blue one, and the red one; and Icohorúšika was the yellowish one. And the other ones, his older brothers, are also stars. They are the trio that are bunched together [the Belt Stars of Orion ?]."

Morning Star, of course, is not a fixed star. Their lack of identity is confirmed in another story in which Man Faces on His Ears coexists with Morning Star. The connection between fixed stars and living beings on the ears finds a parallel in another Hocąk story in which Polaris (the North Star) has hummingbirds as earrings.

== Red Man, Chief of the Herok'a ==
In the Red Horn Cycle, when a human chief offers his daughter as a prize in a race, all the fastest spirits in creation show up to compete. Nevertheless, a completely unknown person wins the race by turning himself into the fleetest of all things, an arrow, and shooting himself ahead of all the other competitors. The victor declares that he goes by the name "Red Horn", but that the spirits know him as "Wears Man-Faces on His Ears". The episode shows that Red Horn has a mystical identity with the arrow.

There are two unpublished stories that reveal Red Horn's sagittary nature. The first is "Chief of the Horok'a", and the other is its variant, "The Red Man". In "Chief of the Herok'a", a great hunter lived with his wife and two small children. He told his wife to avoid his deer traps, but she ignored him, and whenever she went out, she was caught in one of the traps. No trap in which she was caught ever worked again. Finally, he had to shoot his own wife to save his family from starvation. He sent his two children to where his other sons lived, and on the way, the children saw the signs in the sky that their father had been overcome by their mother's brothers. On the way, the little boy was kidnapped by a group of berdaches who had the power to change their size. He made good his escape and joined his sister and brothers. In time the little boy grew up and married a beautiful woman. His mother-in-law would send him on impossibly dangerous missions in order to kill him, but every time he emerged victorious. Among the spirits participating in the feasts that were held afterwards were Turtle and the Forked Man, who had two bodies joined at the waist. The young man allowed his sister to choose her husband from among the assembled spirits, and she picked the Forked Man. The old woman had a nightmare, and when she awoke, she said that the young man must play the game wegodiwa with them. He agreed. The young man with his spirit friends sat on the edge of a cliff while the old woman walked out into the thin air. She and her daughters gave a loud shout, and a gale force wind issued from above, yet the young man and the good spirits held fast. After four such attacks, the good spirits triumphed. The sons of the old woman were the ones who were making the wind. The young man, now in the form of Without Horns (Herok'aga), stood on the water and told his brothers to make the "herok'a breathings." They uttered, ahahe, ahahe, and as they pulled their empty bow strings back and forth, their opponents fell over dead. The young man, Herok'aga, became chief over the village that was once ruled by the slain brothers. In time Herok'aga had a daughter, and when it was time for her to be married, he set up an ordeal designed to test the worth of her suitors. Finally, a Forked Man succeeded, and the couple set out for his home up above where he lived with his grandfather. One day as she was looking into the fire, she saw a head that was made red by the heat, yet it had tears rolling down its cheeks. The head explained that she was his granddaughter and that the old man there had beheaded him and placed him in the fire. She lifted the head out of the fire and put it in a white deerskin. When the Forked Man returned home, the head explained to him all that had happened. The husband demanded that his grandfather tell him where the headless body was, and they went out and found the body wandering around Red Hill. They brought it back and made a sweat bath in which the head was reattached to the body. Once he emerged whole again, he cursed the old man to become an owl. The grandfather whose head was reattached, is the chief of the herok'a. His son is the chief of the little children spirits who have the same power as the herok'a.

From this story it can be learned that the elder man is chief of the herok'a, but his son, even though his name is Without Horns (Heroka'ga), is chief over the little children spirits. Both sets of spirits are able to kill with empty bows, just as though they themselves were the arrows. In "The Red Man", the older man kills his wife because he has caught her making love with a bear. The man who killed him, rather than being turned into an owl, is killed by Trickster and Hare. With a stroke of his club, Hare shattered him into a thousand pieces of flint. The man called the "chief of the herok'a", in this story is brought back to life and called "Red Man" (Wąkšucka), since his body is entirely red in color. Who is Red Man, chief of the herok'a? It would be left to speculation were it not for a story parallel to the Red Horn Cycle, where it is said of Red Horn, "'Without Horns' (herok'a) they call certain beings, he (Red Horn) was their chief; his sons were the chiefs of beings called 'childish people', they say." Therefore, it is Red Horn who is Red Man, chief of the herok'a, and his sons are chiefs of the little children spirits. Both of these are tribes of lilliputian hunting spirits, whose spiritual essence is the arrow, and whose symbol is the bow.

From another unpublished story, “The Baldheaded War Club”, it can be learned more about Red Horn and the herok'a. Trickster (Wakjąkaga) acquired an enormously powerful war club, and to fulfill his role as a savior of humanity, called together a war party to attack the evil spirits who had lorded it over humanity. The members of this select war party were Turtle, Wolf, Sleets as He Walks, Great Black Hawk, Red Horn, Otter, Loon, and the Twins (Flesh and Ghost). Under Trickster's leadership, all kinds of foolish mistakes were made, so a different war leader stepped forward at the critical moment when they were being charged by the evil spirits.

Then the war leader said, "Now then, attendants! I will help you," and at the war leader's forehead stood a single horn, and it was very red. This he took off and struck the water with it, and the water burned like fuel, and there all the bad things were burned up. Then the leader said, "Now then! from henceforth you will no more call me "One Horn". Here the humans are being abused and here I have used my horn, therefore, the humans shall ever call me, "Without Horns", because I have caused myself to be without any," he said. That is why they call them herok'a, meaning "ones without horns".

In this variant, Red Horn is first named "One Horn" (Hejąkiga), then "Without Horns" (Herok'aga), a name which elsewhere is given to his son. This is merely a reflection of the cross-generational identity of Red Horn and his sons. In one story the son of Red Horn is called by one of Red Horn's old lovers by the name "Red Horn"; and in another story, the father of Red Horn is Wears Man-Faces on His Ears, another form of Red Horn himself.

The he, "horn", in the names He-jąki-ga ("One Horn"), He-rok'a-ga ("Without Horns"), and He-šuc-ka ("Red Horn"), can be understood in these sagittary terms. In the myth known as "The Brown Squirrel", the hero of the story terrorizes a bad spirit by constantly pointing a red cedar horn at him. The horn is usually called "the red protruding horn" (he-pųjoge-šujera). However, once it is simply called he-pųjogera, "the protruding horn". At the very end of the myth the bad spirit is turned into a brown squirrel and told, "Humans you tried to abuse, so ever after will boys shoot you with protruding horns (he-pųjogera)." Therefore, arrows are horns, and paradigmatically, red horns. Consequently, the name Hešucka ("Red Horn") not only refers to his red braid or "horn", but to his mystical identity with the arrow. It is also the reason why the race over whom he is chief is called "without horns", since they fire their bows without the need of an arrow. In a race, the Red Horn is triumphant over all the spirits, for he himself is the arrow he shoots to victory.

== Red Horn's sons ==
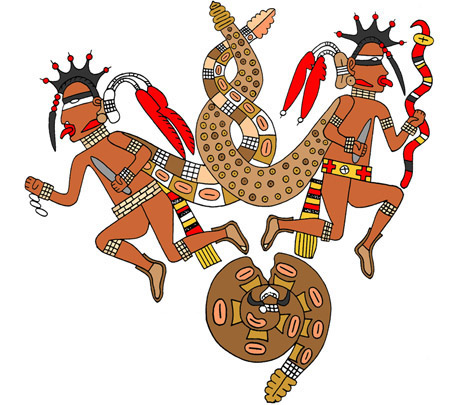
"Hero Twins" emerging from a crack in the back of a raccoon-faced Horned Serpent called a Sinti Shaui by the Choctaw.

The two wives of Red Horn were pregnant at the time of his death. Red Horn's first wife, the girl in the white beaverskin wrap, gave birth to a son who had the same red hair and human heads hanging from his ears as his father. Red Horn's second wife, the giantess, also gave birth to a red haired boy, but with living faces where his nipples should have been. The sons were spared by the giants and grew up to be very large. One day the eldest son went out to fast in order to get a blessing from the thunderbirds. He went to seek his visions at a place not far from a broad prairie where the giants had a village. He knew that the head of his father, whose hair had by now turned white, hung from a lodge pole there. When he called out to the spirits with a death song, the kind sung by prisoners about to be executed, the giants who heard it would immediately jump into the fire. When the old men of the village saw that so many of their people were jumping in the flames, they guessed at the cause, and ordered four warriors to guard the scalp pole. Two of the guards painted themselves red and the others painted themselves black.

Red Horn's two sons decided then to retrieve the heads of their father and his friends. They used their powers to make special red and black arrows to kill the guards, then grabbed the heads and ran with them. As the boys ran they shot the giants with their arrows, each arrow killing many giants. When they ran out of arrows, they used their bows as clubs, almost wiping out the giants completely. A little girl with a boy that she packed on her back were spared so that the race of giants would not become extinct, but they were thrown to the other side of the sea so that they would no longer be a threat. The two sons then burned the bodies of the giants and ground up their bones and spread the powder around their own village. The two sons took the head of Red Horn and asked their mothers to sleep with it, but each replied, "How can I sleep with that, it is only a skull?" The boys took all three heads and laid them in a bed in the middle of the lodge. The next day Red Horn, Turtle, and Storms as He Walks were all found alive and sleeping in the bed. Where the sons had scattered the powdered bones of the giants, all the people that the giants had killed were also found alive and sleeping. When Red Horn's wives saw this, they shouted, "Oh, our sons have brought our husbands back to life again!" The boys picked up their fathers and carried them around like children. In honor of this feat, Turtle and Storms as He Walks promised the boys special weapons. In another episode, the sons of Red Horn decided to go on the warpath. The older brother asked Storms as He Walks for the Thunderbird Warbundle. After some effort, it was produced, but the thunderbirds demanded that it have a case. A friend of the sons of Red Horn offered his own body as its case. The boys take the Thunderbird Warbundle and with their followers went on a raid to the other side of the sky.

Hall has shown that the mythic cycle of Red Horn and his sons has some interesting analogies with the Hero Twins mythic cycle of Mesoamerica.

== Red Horn in archaeology ==
Some images found in or near the SECC area may be of Red Horn, his companions, and his sons. Scattered throughout most of this area are relics of prosopic earpieces, which must have given the wearer an appearance strikingly like that of mythical Red Horn. Other artifacts, such as the bilobed arrow, may shed light on an obscure name held by Red Horn in his youth, "He Who is Hit with Deer Lungs". Intricately carved effigy pipes have been recovered as well, one of which, nicknamed "Big Boy", has been widely identified with Red Horn. There also exist numerous depictions of a raptorial bird whose head has many human features. James A. Brown has argued that this "Birdman", who is often shown wearing prosopic earpieces, is also a form of Red Horn. Pictographs found in caves have also been related to Red Horn. Salzer contends that the scene of Panel 5 at the Gottschall Rockshelter represents Red Horn and his friends confronting the giants. At Picture Cave, discovered by Carol Diaz-Granados, there exists a pictograph the central figure of which wears prosopic earpieces, leading to the suggestion that he represents an early form of Red Horn.

=== Prosopic earpieces as SECC artifacts ===
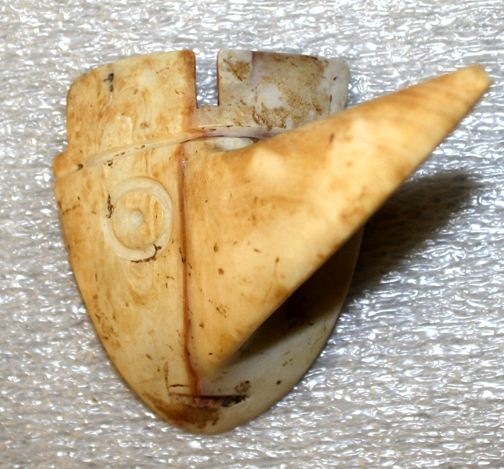
A Long-nosed god maskette excavated from the Yokem Mound Group in Pike County, Illinois, now in the N.M.A.I.

In the Ioway version of the Red Horn story, Wears Man-Heads in His Ears puts on a pair of prosopic earpieces which come to life. Prosopic ear ornaments have been found throughout much of the S.E.C.C. culture area in archaeological excavations and are called "Long-nosed god maskettes". They are typically made of either copper or shell, which were highly valued materials. Most wampum belts, for instance, are made of shells strung together. In contemporary Hotcąk the standard word for wampum is worušik, a word which also denotes earrings. It is a contraction of wa-horušik, "something suspended from the ears". This shows a linguistic "memory" of a time when at least certain earpieces were considered to be wampum. The S.E.C.C. artifacts have a high degree of uniformity except for the size of the nose, which may be either short or extraordinarily long and even crooked. The face is shield-shaped, and has a crown with a notch at its top center rim. The mouth is just a short slit, but the eyes are perfectly circular and large in proportion to the head, giving them an owl-like appearance. The first of these was discovered in Big Mound within St. Louis in 1870, where they lay beside the skull in a grave. Since then nearly two score of these artifacts have been discovered in an area encompassing at least ten states. S.E.C.C. pictorial art shows figures with long-nosed god maskettes on their ears, recalling the appearance of Red Horn and his sons. One of these is a sculpted pipe bowl, nicknamed "Big Boy", showing a seated young man wearing short-nosed prosopic earpieces (discussed below). They came to be called "Long-Nosed God" mask(ette)s because they were correlated with depictions of what appeared to be a deity with a very long nose. One of these has in addition to a long nose, a bilobed arrow attached to his hair, and a single long braid, all characteristics associated with Red Horn. On the other hand, such beings often have a curl at the end of their noses, either bending up or down, a feature not found on their maskette counterparts. In addition a great many prosopic earpieces have only a short nose. This has led Duncan and Diaz-Granados to develop a different theory to account for the variation in nose sizes. They believe that the prosopic earpieces represent the Twins, and that they were worn by war captives who were being assimilated into their new tribe. This is chartered by one surviving Twins myth, in which the wild brother has a very long nose in contrast to the normal nose of his domesticated brother. When the wild Twin is re-adopted into his family, the father trims the nose. Ex hypothesi, the size of the nose on the prosopic earpiece given to the adopted captive was trimmed to reflect the degree to which he had been assimilated.

=== Struck with Deer Lungs and the pipe ceremony ===
Not surprisingly, given his status as Chief of the Herok'a, Red Horn has a special connection to deer. The Red Horn Cycle tells of the time when Red Horn, the youngest brother, was following his other brothers to a race to which he alone was not invited.

The people were saying, "Kunu (eldest born) has come and the one at whom Kunu used to throw deer lungs, his youngest brother, he has also come along." So Kunu looked behind him and, sure enough, there was his little brother following, wearing an untanned deerskin blanket turned inside out. The fur was on the outside.

His cervid identity is expressed in his going about in the outward form of a deer. Right up to the end of the story, Red Horn is known only by the name "He who Gets Hit with Deer Lungs," Kunu explains to his wife, "Once I told him to fast and he refused so I threw a deer lung at him and that is the reason why they called him by that name but no one ever hit him with a deer lung." So Kunu had been giving him the lungs to eat, since he had refused to go without food. Far from being a poor cut of meat, it is something special. In one story, the dogs decide that if their master gives them the deer lung hanging in his lodge, they will make him prosper in game. The reason for the gourmet value of deer lungs (ca raxúra) is explained in connection with an episode in a story entitled "The Fleetfooted Man":

There a Hotcâk village was. To a great warrior was born a baby boy. It was very good. He grew larger, and when he was old enough to eat, whenever his father could, he would feed him only deer lungs. He wanted him to be able to run fast, that is why he did it.

It should come as no great surprise that a diet of deer lungs might be thought to empower a person to have lungs like those of a deer, and the capacity for speed that this endowment would bequeath. So when the youngest brother is struck with deer lungs, it expresses the notion that Red Horn is someone who will have lungs like a deer and therefore a fleetness of foot that will rival a cervid. Indeed, his victory in the foot race, the major event of this episode, is a mere confirmation of this achievement. So the name that is presented as a misnomer, turns out on an esoteric level to be an understated description for the spirit who travels as fast as an arrow.

Archaeologists have attempted to connect the name with a widespread pipe ceremony associated with the affirmation of kinship and adoption. These factors enter the discussion because of the relationship between Red Horn and his sons. Red Horn finds a twin in one of his sons, and a near twin in the other. It is said in the Red Horn Cycle, after the friends of Red Horn have given his sons gifts of their trademark weapons, "Then Red Horn said, 'My sons, I have nothing to give you, for I am not your equal and, besides, you are already just like me.' And indeed they were." Most of all, the sons of Red Horn brought their father back to life. These facts have led archaeologists to see the story of Red Horn in terms of the immortality of reproduction: a man lives on in his sons, to whom he gives a genetic patrimony that makes them just like himself. Consequently, ceremonies of adoption become highly relevant to the understanding of Red Horn, since they represent a ceremonial way of conveying the fundamental meaning of the Red Horn epic. Aside from the knowledge held by Hocągara ceremonial people themselves, little is known of sacred pipe and adoption ceremonies among the Hocągara, so Hall attempts to generalize from what he concludes is a nearly universal, pan-Indian, post-contact pipe ceremony of adoption. Its paradigm is the ceremony of the Osage, a people related in speech to the Hotcągara, and Hall uses the colonial-era French term, "calumet" instead of the Osage or Hocągara names for their ceremonial pipes. Hall sums up his basic argument:

In the Iowa version the two boys put the heads of Human-head-earrings and his two friends on the earth and shoot three arrows into the air, after which the owners of the three heads come to life. This recalls the use of the symbolic gesture with arrows -- the calumets -- to mediate the reconception of the adoptee in the (Pawnee) Hako ceremony. More important, it recalls the third name by which Red Horn or He-who-wears-human-heads-as-earrings was known -- He-who-is-hit-with-deer-lungs -- because the owl feathers attached to the calumets represented deer lungs. The calumet stems represented windpipes as well as arrow shafts, and the combination of windpipe and lungs was believed to introduce a quickening breath into the nose of the adoptee that then descended into his chest and gave him life. Logically, the name He-who-is-hit-with-deer-lungs could derive from a ritual in which an impersonator of He-who-wears-human-heads-as-earrings was symbolically requickened with the calumets.

The Osage actually have a Deer Lung Clan which is active in the ceremony.

=== Big Boy ===
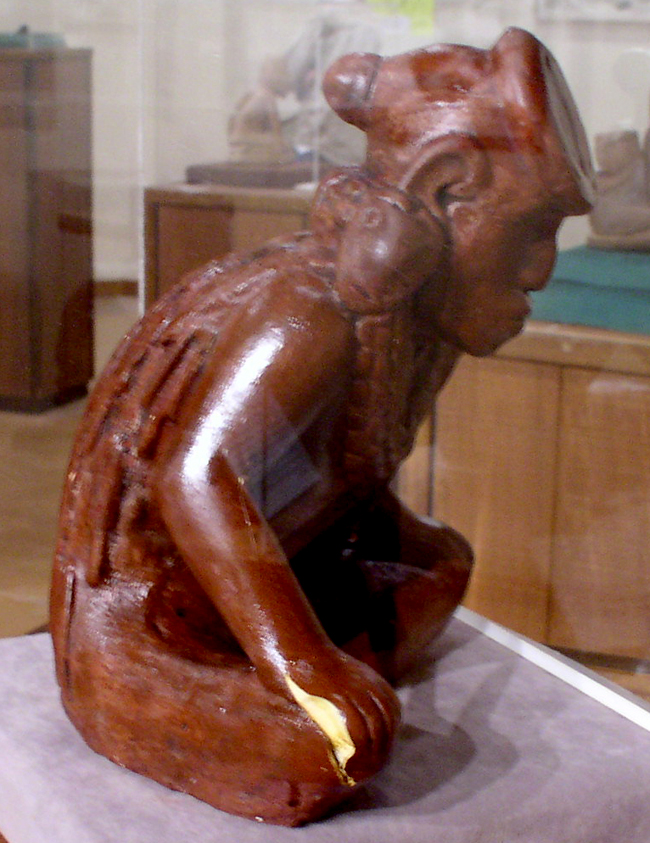
The carved stone pipe nicknamed "Big Boy".

"Big Boy", which was uncovered from the Great Mortuary of Craig Mound at Spiro, is a large effigy pipe weighing 11 lbs., 8 oz., probably made of bauxite. It is likely that it was originally a sculpture that was only later converted into a pipe bowl. This remarkable artifact was first illustrated in 1952. The figure is nude, with his hair arranged in an occipital bun and a long braid hanging over his left shoulder. His only body clothing is a cape draped over his back. The cape has a "spade" or feather design, leading most archaeologists to conclude that it was a feather cape, a mantle well known from many Native American cultures in historical times. However, it seems unlikely that it actually is a feather cape.

The blanket ... is decorated with a "spade" design, which, considering the accuracy of detail and faithfulness of depiction in the rest of the pipe, is a detail that should be interpreted literally rather than figuratively. In this light, the "spade" design elements should be regarded as part of the blanket itself.

It once bore a heavy coat of red ochre, some of which is still visible. He also wears a flat cap with a raised border around its top which has an "ogee" design in negative relief. Brown believes that this cap "appears to be a case for displaying a copper plate." The subject of the sculpture also wears a rich, triple-strand necklace of wampum beads. His most interesting feature, however, is a pair of prosopic ear ornaments, clearly of the Short-Nosed God type. Reilly, on the assumption that the SECC clay effigy pipes are of divine subjects, concludes, because of Big Boy's long red braid and prosopic earpieces, that he must represent "Morning Star" (by which he means Red Horn). James A. Brown leans strongly towards this view, but voices a note of caution:

All told, we have in this figure a remarkable combination of the very elements by which the Red Horn hero-deity of the Winnebago is identified in myth. Although this might suggest that the Red Horn identification can be extrapolated into deep antiquity, caution is dictated because of the inherent ambiguities attendant upon the sources of our information, to say nothing of the time spread involved.

In a departure from the received opinion, Duncan and Diaz-Granados contend that the prosopic earpieces represent the Twins and were used by captives being adopted into the tribe. Consequently, they view Big Boy as a representation of such an adoptee, and not as Red Horn himself.

=== Bird Man ===
Another figure found in SECC artworks is a raptor with a largely human face, who is often depicted wearing prosopic earpieces. This werebird, known as "Birdman", is also thought by some to be a form of Red Horn.

=== The Gottschall pictographs ===
Gottschall Rockshelter (a horizontally shallow cave), located in Muscoda, Wisconsin, contains about forty pictographs. Robert J. Salzer began to excavate the site in 1982, eight years after it had been rediscovered. He identified Panel 5 to be of special interest, since it is a composition containing several figures that seem to be engaged in a single action. Panel 5 is dated with a good measure of confidence to the tenth century A.D. At the outset, Robert L. Hall, the leader in the field, pointed out to Selzer that one of the figures in Panel 5 appeared to have attributes associated with the Red Horn mythology.

The character in your Fig. 4 has a pattern around each nipple which resembles the long-nose god maskettes. The face[s] of the maskettes are of the same outline as that found around each nipple on the pictograph. I first interpreted the two parallel lines above the "face" outline as the red horn. I now feel that they represent the long nose of the long-nosed god in a face-on perspective which the artists could not quite handle. That leaves the nipples for the mouth and tongue, and remember that the little faces stuck out their tongues when manipulated. The stone Big Boy pipe from Spiro had long-nose god maskettes on each ear, and I would guess that is what Red Horn also wore on his ears and was the reason he was called He-who-wears-human-heads-as-earrings.

Salzer identified the other figures as being two giants, one of whom was the woman that eventually married Red Horn, and other pictographs seemed to be of Turtle and Storms-as-He-Walks, all of whom had gathered together on the occasion of the great lacrosse game between the good spirits and the giants. Salzer believes, contrary to Hall, that the figure to the far right is not a son of Red Horn, but Red Horn himself. The reason why prosopic earpieces can not be seen is that part of the tail of the bird in the center of the panel has been painted over Red Horn's ears. Most archaeologists have accepted the idea that the panel is devoted to Red Horn mythology, although a few others have been highly skeptical.

=== Picture Cave ===
The Red Horn panel from Picture Cave, Missouri.

In Warren County, Missouri, there is a site appropriately styled "Picture Cave". As its name suggests, it contains a wealth of pictographs, including one that has been identified with the Hotcąk spirit Red Horn (Wears Faces on His Ears). Other pictographs in Picture Cave have been dated from about 915 AD to 1066 AD, although the age of the "Red Horn" pictograph has so far not been determined. It differs stylistically from the other pictographs in the cave and has a patina of silica which may suggest that it is older than the others. Almost solely on the basis of the prosopic earpiece, Duncan connects the main character of this scene with Red Horn. He describes the chief figure in the panel as "Morning Star (known by the Winnebago as Red Horn)", an identification which has now become universal among archaeologists (see the section above, "Red Horn as a Star"). He also believes that the Red Horn of Picture Cave is carrying the head of Morning Star, which he describes as an act of self-resurrection. Nevertheless, at one point Duncan says, with respect to the "Red Horn" pictograph, "This 'early' Braden style rendering conforms to the description of He-who-wears-human-heads-as-earrings, or Red Horn, after he wrestled with the 'giants'. Red Horn's head is described as being carried by one of his sons ... this is an unmistakable scene at Picture Cave that is finely and delicately rendered and includes a substantial use of white pigment."

== See also ==
- Ho-Chunk mythology
- Ho-Chunk
- Ioway
- Native American tribes in Nebraska
- Southeastern Ceremonial Complex
