= Harold Reynolds (disambiguation) =

Harold Reynolds (born 1960), baseball player.

Harold Reynolds may also refer to:

- Harold Reynolds (cyclist), British Olympic cyclist
- Harold Reynolds, protagonist of Harold (film)

== See also ==
- Harry Reynolds (disambiguation)
