= Henry Reynolds (archaeologist) =

Henry Reynolds was an important Archaeologist in Georgia.

In 1888, Henry L. Reynolds joined the Mound Exploration Division of the Bureau of American Ethnology. The purpose of this division, directed by Cyrus Thomas, was to conduct an extensive survey of Indian mounds in the eastern United States. While the Mound Exploration Division investigated mound sites in many eastern states, Reynolds performed most of his research in South Carolina and Georgia. In fact, Reynolds’ excavations at the Hollywood Mounds site, located on a bend of the Savannah River about ten miles south of Augusta, Georgia are thought to be the most proficient excavation undertaken in Georgia during the Bureau’s involvement. The Hollywood Mounds site consists of two medium-sized platform mounds. Reynolds fully excavated the smaller of the two mounds and discovered many elaborate artifacts belonging to the Southern Cult, as well as several burials. In his investigations of the Hollywood Mounds site, Reynolds considered the site inside of an ecological setting; he was one of the first archaeologists in the world to think of any site in an ecological context. Many consider Reynolds to be the first “modern” archaeologist in Georgia.

After the Mound Exploration project came to a close, Reynolds was the only assistant retained by the Bureau. In 1894, while completing the project’s report, Cyrus Thomas sent Reynolds back to Georgia and South Carolina to retrieve some final information. After finishing at the Hollywood site, Reynolds proceeded to South Carolina, where he took ill and died suddenly in the field.
