= St. Johns culture =

Archaeological culture in North America

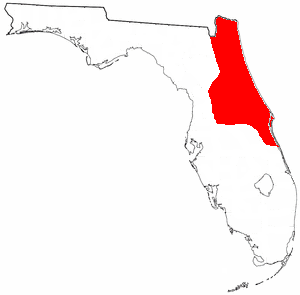
Approximate area of the St. Johns culture region in Florida

The St. Johns culture was an archaeological culture in northeastern Florida, USA that lasted from about 500 BCE (the end of the Archaic period) until shortly after European contact in the 17th century. The St. Johns culture was present along the St. Johns River and its tributaries (including the Oklawaha River, and along the Atlantic coast of Florida from the mouth of the St. Johns River south to a point east of the head of the St. Johns River, near present-day Cocoa Beach, Florida. At the time of first European contact, the St. Johns culture area was inhabited by speakers of the Mocama (or Agua Salada), Agua Fresca and Acuera dialects of the Timucua language and by the Mayacas.

== Defining characters and environment ==
The St. Johns culture is defined in terms of pottery styles. Plain chalky ware was the dominant St. Johns ceramic type. ("Chalky" ware was made from clay taken from fresh water sources, which contained spicules from fresh water sponges. The spicules in the clay helped strengthen the pottery, and created a "chalky" surface, soft enough to be scratched with a fingernail.) "Exotic" ceramic ware is common, especially in ceremonial contexts. These "exotic" ceramics represent types from the Deptford, Glades, Belle Glade, Swift Creek, Weeden Island, Savannah, Safety Harbor, and Fort Walton cultures. There was a transitional area from the mouth of the St. Johns River extending into southeastern Georgia where St. Johns ware overlapped with Savannah ware, and another transitional area, the Indian River region (southern Brevard County, and Indian River and St. Lucie counties), where St. Johns ware overlapped with Belle Glade and Glades ware.

The St. Johns culture was based on the exploitation of marine and fresh water resources. Villages and camps were located close to rivers, lakes, wetlands, coastal lagoons and estuaries. During the 2000 years of the St. Johns culture, large middens of shell and other debris, sometimes covering several acres and often up to 25 feet (7.6 m) high, accumulated throughout the region (Turtle Mound, near New Smyrna Beach, Florida, was estimated to be 75 feet (23 m) high before it was reduced by shellrock mining in the 19th and 20th centuries). Some existing mounds extend for as long as a half-mile along the banks of the St. Johns River.

== Diet and resources ==
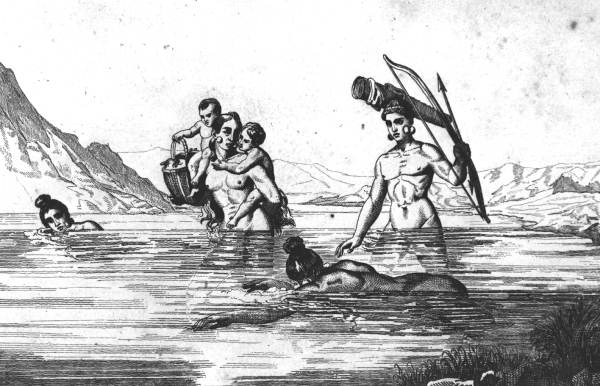
The people of the St. Johns culture, such as these Timucuans pictured in 1562 by Jacques Le Moyne, obtained much of their food from the water.

While oyster, clam and mussel shells dominate the middens, bones found in the middens indicate that catfish were a much larger component of the St. Johns people's diet than were shellfish. The St. Johns diet consisted of a wide variety of fish, shellfish, reptiles, mammals and birds. Investigation of a site at Hontoon Island indicated that fresh water snails, fish and turtles provided most of the meat consumed at the site, and that those resources were exploited year-round. Plant foods included berries, nuts, cabbage palm, amaranth, and various small plants, especially those growing in wetlands. Gourds were grown, but probably used as containers. Maize cultivation reached the Timucua speakers of the St. Johns culture area around 750, although some authorities think the arrival was as late as 1050. The southernmost part of the St. Johns culture area (the Mayacas) had not acquired maize cultivation at the time of first European contact. The St. Johns peoples were not as dependent on maize cultivation as were most cultures in the southeastern United States, as suitable soil for sustainable maize production was scarce in the wetlands favored for habitation, and abundant wetland resources were available year-round.

Except along the western fringes of the region, the only stone resources available were soft coquina and sandstone, which were used for grinding and abrading tools. Tools and implements were more often made of bone and shell, than of stone. Stone artifacts (usually made of chert) in the St. Johns culture are a mixture of styles preserved from the Archaic period with styles representative of neighboring cultures. Wooden artifacts that were preserved in water and wet soils have also been found.

== Mounds ==
Purpose-built mounds of sand (as opposed to shell middens) first appeared in the St. Johns culture region around 100 CE. As was common throughout Florida, mounds were used for burials. Some bodies were buried intact, in a flexed position, but most were first placed in charnel houses, which were often built on top of a mound. The flesh was removed from, or allowed to rot off of, the bones, and the bones were cleaned. Eventually the accumulated long bones and skulls of each individual were bundled and then buried in a group in the mound. The charnel house would then be destroyed, often by fire. A new layer of sand might then be added to the mound, and a new charnel house build on the top.

The early mounds in the St. Johns culture region were generally 4 feet (1.2 m) high up to an occasional 10 feet (3.0 m). The number of burials in a mound might be as high as 100, but most held fewer than 25. After 1050 influence from the Mississippian culture led some groups to construct platform mounds, which may have been topped by temples and/or chiefs' residences. One of these mounds, the Shields Mound in Duval County, eventually reached 190 feet (58 m) along each side of the base, and held 150 burials. Another mound, Mt. Royal Mound, just north of Lake George, which was 15 feet (4.6 m) high and 160 feet (49 m) in diameter, was primarily a burial mound. This mound also contained many items apparently received as trade goods from the region of the Mississippian culture. Chiefdoms in the St. Johns culture region did not achieve the size and power of those to the west, from the Florida panhandle through to the Mississippi valley, and large platform mounds were rare in the St. Johns region.
