= Alligator Effigy Mound =

Effigy mound in Granville, Ohio, United States

- U.S. National Register of Historic Places
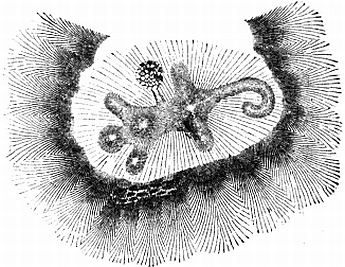

- Location within Ohio Location within the United States
- Nearest city: Granville, Ohio
- Coordinates: 40°4′11.76″N 82°30′3.71″W
- NRHP reference No.: 71000643
- Added to NRHP: November 5, 1971

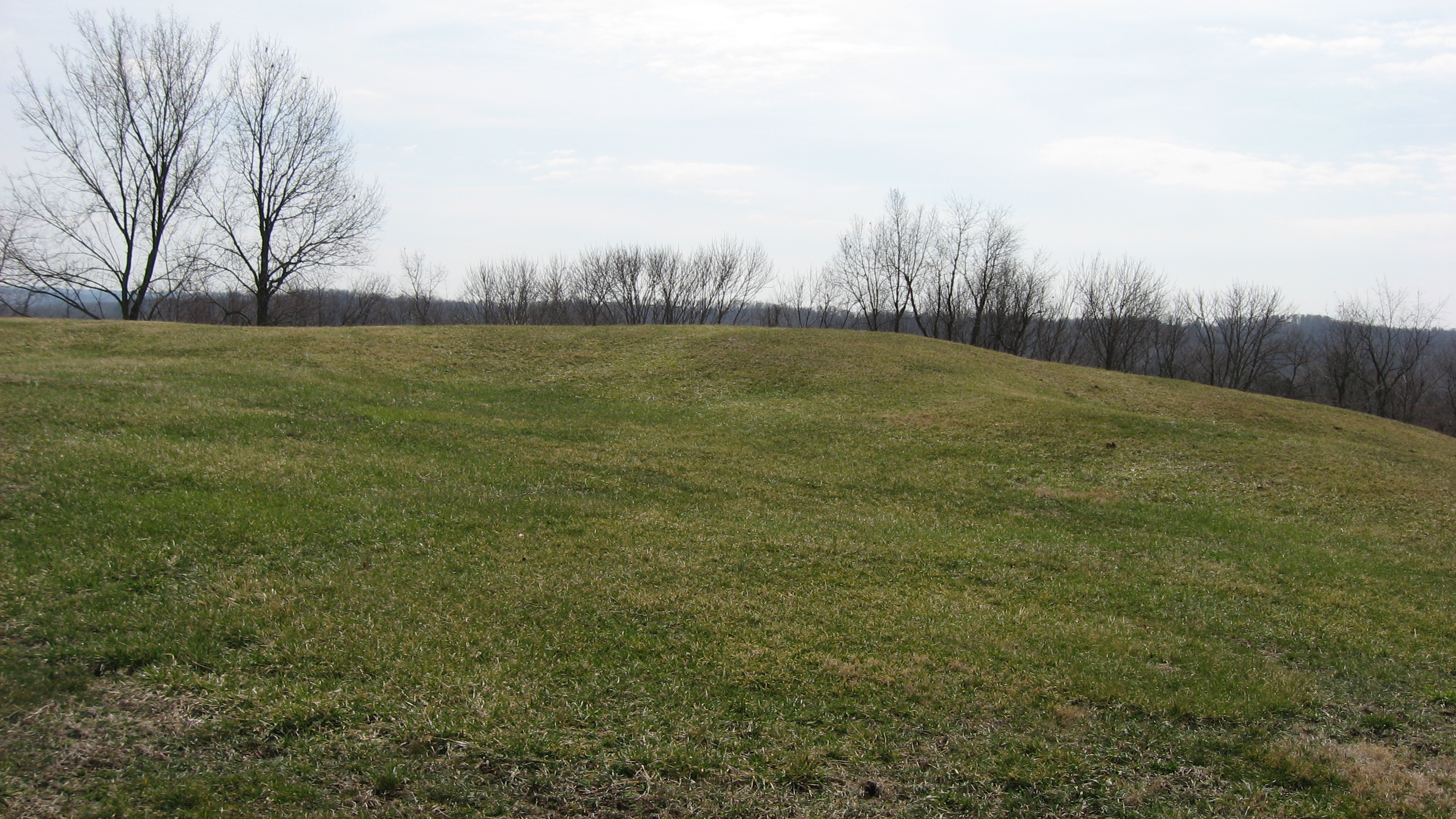
Photo of the site

The Alligator Effigy Mound is an effigy mound in Granville, Ohio, United States. The mound is believed to have been built between AD 800 and 1200 by people of the Fort Ancient culture. The mound was likely a ceremonial site, as it was not used for burials.

Located on privately owned land, but accessible to the public, Alligator Mound is one of two extant effigy mounds known in the present-day state of Ohio, along with Serpent Mound in Adams County, Ohio. Effigy mounds were built more often by ancient indigenous peoples located in the areas of the present-day states of Illinois, Iowa, and Wisconsin than in the Ohio area, and many have survived there.

The site has been listed on the National Register of Historic Places since 1971. It is marked by an Ohio State Historical Marker, erected in 1998.

== Survey history ==
=== Squier and Davis: 1848 ===
Ephraim George Squier and Edwin Hamilton Davis surveyed the privately held site in Granville, Ohio for the Smithsonian Institution and reported their findings in their 1848 publication Ancient Monuments of the Mississippi Valley. They described the site as "strange." They report the location of the work as being 150 to 200 feet in height. They note that people in the area called it "the alligator," "although the figure bears as a close resemblance to the lizard as any other reptile." The head of the effigy points towards the southwest. The work totaled 250 feet in length from head to tail. The body was noted at 40 feet wide, and each leg was measured at 36 feet. They describe the ends of the paws as being "a little broader than the remaining portions of the same, as if the spread of those toes had been originally indicated."

Squier and Davis note that the head, shoulders and rump of the effigy are higher than the rest of the body. The height of the mound ranges from four feet to six feet. In the middle of the effigy was a small mound, which they believed was used as an altar. Stones covered the altar, with marks from being lit on fire in the past. A graded way was made from the altar to the "top of the effigy." The graded way is ten feet wide. They note evidence of excavation in parts of the effigy with little disturbance to the site. Through excavation they determined that the site is made of clay and that the clay had been imported from another area. They also noted that no historical excavation, made by the creators of the effigy, was found in the region.

They examine the headland where the mound is built. They describe it as a "beautifully rounded spur of land," and question if the site was rounded by humans to create such a rounded place. During their visit, they also noticed that damage had been done to the headland. They note that other earthworks can be seen from the top of the headland, specifically those in the Newark group.

After their survey, Squier and Davis concluded that the site was used for sacrifices or "on stated or extraordinary occasions,".

=== Lepper and Frolking: 1999 ===
In 1999, Brad Lepper and Tod A. Frolking conducted a professional archaeological investigation of the mound. By radiometric dating of a piece of charcoal recovered from the base of the mound, they estimate its construction to have been 1,000 years BP (about AD 950). Lepper suggests that the Alligator Mound is an effigy of an underwater panther, a powerful figure in Native American myth. He thinks that early European settlers misinterpreted what Native Americans told them about the effigy. They were told that it was a fierce creature that lived in the water and ate people, which they assumed to be an alligator.
