= Robert Smith (Medal of Honor) =

US Army Medal of Honor recipient (1847–1930)

Robert Smith (birth name Harry Reynolds) (1847–1930) was a recipient of the Medal of Honor for heroism in combat during the Battle of Slim Buttes in Dakota Territory on September 9, 1876.

== Biography ==
Smith was born as Harry Reynolds in Memphis, Tennessee, on August 8, 1847, and enlisted in the U.S. Army at Philadelphia, Pennsylvania. under the assumed name of Robert Smith. He was assigned to Troop M, 3rd U.S. Cavalry. He was awarded the Medal of Honor on October 16, 1877.

After leaving the Army, he reverted to his birth name. He is buried in Elko, Nevada.

== Medal of Honor citation ==
- For special bravery in endeavoring to dislodge Indians secreted in a ravine on 9 September 1876, while serving with Company M, 3d U.S. Cavalry, in action at Slim Buttes, Dakota Territory.
