= Henry Reynolds (soldier) =

English Victoria Cross recipient (1883–1948)

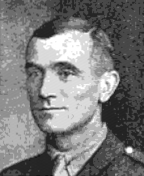
- Born: 16 August 1883; Whilton, Northamptonshire, England
- Died: 26 March 1948 (aged 64); Carshalton, Surrey, England
- Burial place: St Giles' Churchyard, Ashtead
- Military career
- Allegiance: United Kingdom
- Branch: British Army
- Rank: Captain
- Unit: The Royal Scots
- Conflicts: World War I
- Awards: Victoria Cross; Military Cross

Henry Reynolds VC MC (16 August 1883 – 26 March 1948) was an English recipient of the Victoria Cross, the highest and most prestigious award for gallantry in the face of the enemy that can be awarded to British and Commonwealth forces.

Reynolds was 38 years old, and a temporary captain in the 12th Battalion, The Royal Scots (The Lothian Regiment), British Army during the First World War when the following deed took place for which he was awarded the VC.

On 20 September 1917 near Frezenberg, Belgium, Captain Reynolds' company was suffering heavy casualties from enemy machine guns and a pill-box. Captain Reynolds reorganised his men and then proceeded alone, rushing from shell-hole to shell-hole under heavy fire. When near the pill-box, he threw a grenade which should have fallen inside, but the entrance was blocked, so crawling to the entrance he forced a phosphorus grenade in. This set the place on fire, killing three, and the remainder surrendered with two machine guns. Afterwards, although wounded, Captain Reynolds captured another objective, with 70 prisoners and two more machine guns.

== The Medal ==
His Victoria Cross is displayed at the Royal Scots Museum, Edinburgh Castle, Scotland.

== Birth ==
The inscription on his monument in St. Giles', Ashtead gives his birth as 16 August 1883. However, there is no birth or baptism recorded for him in 1883 in Whilton. According to the Whilton parish register there is a baptism of a Henry, child of Henry Thomas & Tryphena Reynolds, on 20 November 1879. This birth was registered in the Daventry district during the last quarter of 1879, in volume 3b, page 114.
