= Shell gorget =

Form of Native American art

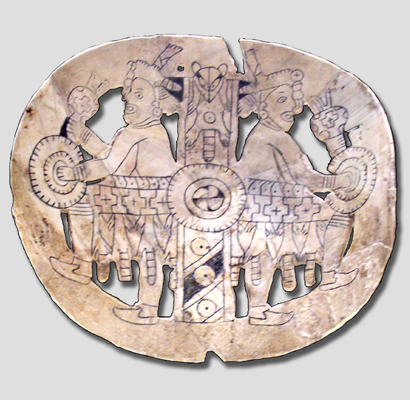
Engraved and fenestrated shell gorget from Spiro Mounds, ancestral Caddo or Wichita

Shell gorgets are a Native American art form of polished, carved shell pendants worn around the neck. The gorgets are frequently engraved, and are sometimes highlighted with pigments, or fenestrated (pierced with openings).

Shell gorgets were most common in Eastern Woodlands of the United States, during the Hopewell tradition (200 BCE – 500 CE) and Mississippian cultural period (c. 800–1500 CE); however, tribes from other regions and time periods also carved shell gorgets. The earliest shell gorgets date back to 3000 years BP. They are believed to have been insignia of status or rank, either civic, military, or religious, or amulets of protective medicine. Due to the placement of the holes in the gorgets, they are also thought to be spinners that could produce whistling sounds.

== Materials and techniques ==
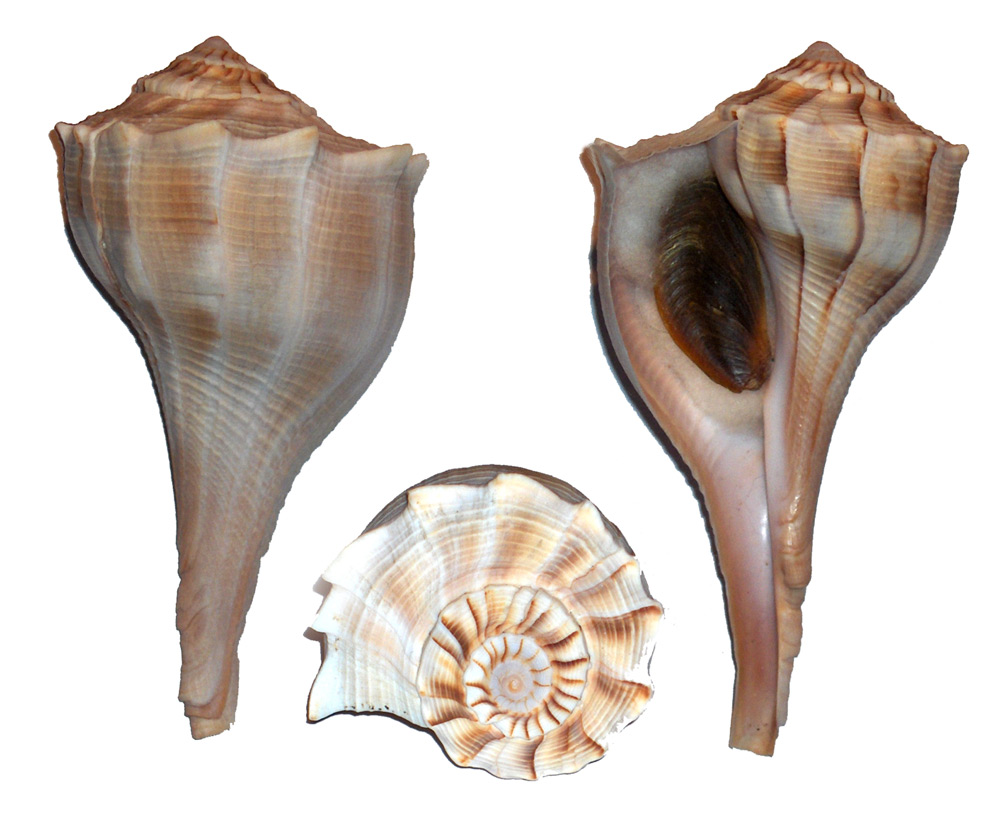
Views of a Sinistrofulgur perversum shell

Lightning whelk (Sinistrofulgur perversum) is the most common shell used for gorgets. Other shells, such as the true conch or Strombus, as well as freshwater mussels, are also carved into gorgets. Today, due to environmental causes, harvested lightning whelks are significantly smaller than in precontact times. These earlier shells typically ranged from 6 to 12 inches (15 to 30 cm) in length.

Harvested off the coasts of Florida and the Gulf of Mexico, the shells were traded through the Eastern Woodlands. This native trade continued into the 16th century.

Gorgets are carved from the penultimate whorl of the shell. A blank is cut or broken out, then ground smooth. Holes for suspension and decoration are drilled, sometimes with a bow drills or chert drills. The gorget forms a concave shape and, when engraved, the interior is polished and decorated.

While most gorgets are circular, some are shaped as rectangles with rounded corners, maskettes, or other novel shapes. An extremely elaborate pendant from Spiro Mounds is shaped as two hands connected by a common beaded bracelet.

== Archaic and Hopewell ==
Adena cultures created gorgets from slate and copper, but the Hopewell Exchange System brought exotic shells from the Gulf northward. Initially, Hopewellian peoples carved plain shell gorgets around 1000 BCE. Engraved gorgets appeared in the late Hopewell. A Glacial Kame culture marine-shell gorget from the Great Lakes dates from 1000 BCE and features an engraved bear or opossum with an umbilical cord.

== Mississippian ==
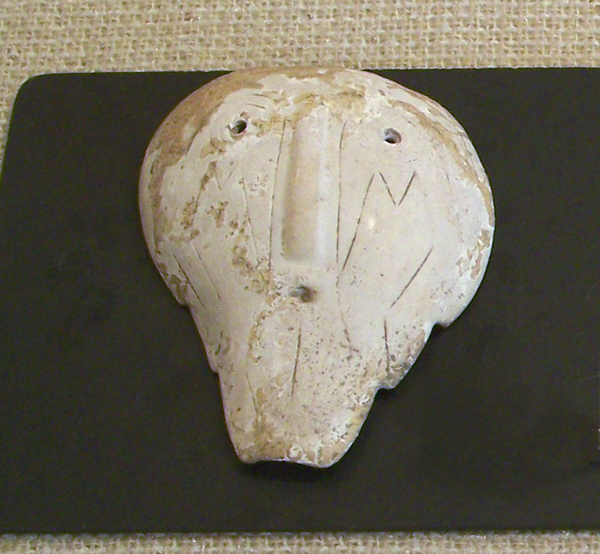
Mask gorget with forked-eye motifs, from the Nodena site in Arkansas

As Mississippian shell gorgets were traded widely, common designs have a widespread geographical distribution. Calusa people of southern Florida harvested and carved gorgets. Coiled rattlesnakes gorgets were found among the Guale Indians of Georgia.

Mask gorgets, although rare, are found throughout the southeast, with the most prominent site clusters occurring in the Ohio River valley, eastern Tennessee, and the Arkansas delta, although finds have been found as far afield as North Dakota. The masks have bas-relief noses, drilled eyes, engraved or drill mouths, and sometimes forked-eye motifs or zigzags under the eyes. Small shell cameos, under two inches wide, were found at Spiro Mounds. Although dating is difficult in the current archaeological context, these masks are likely to be a later phenomenon (c. 1500–1700): although they are often found in sites that also produce 16th century Spanish trade goods, they are entirely absent from classic mound sites, which were active until the fourteenth century.

=== Iconography ===
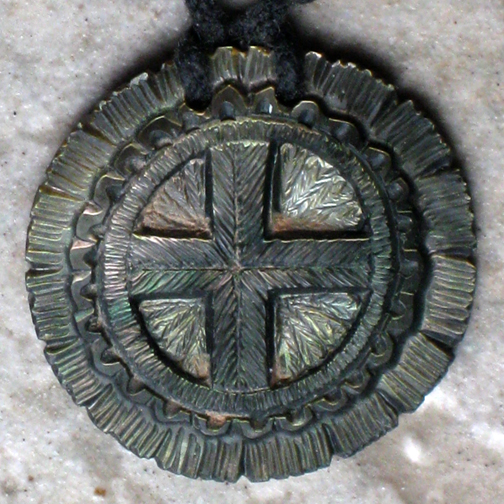
Contemporary miniature gorget by Dan Townsend, featuring a cross-in-circle motif

Iconography on the shell gorgets comes from the Mississippian Ideological Interaction Sphere. Extremely common designs include the triskele, coiled rattlesnake, spider, chunkey player, and birdman, sometimes called a Falcon Impersonater.

Native Americans, art historians, and anthropologists all have a wide range of often conflicting interpretations of the Mississippian iconography. Coiled rattlesnake gorgets were often found in the graves of young people and are believed to relate to age as opposed to status. The forked-eye motif, commonly identified as markings from a peregrine falcon, dates back to the Hopewell exchange, and the symbol references excellent vision and hunting skill among Muscogee Creek people. "Strength of Life" design is interpreted by Kvokovtee Scott and Phillip Deer (Muscogee medicine man) as referencing a whirlwind and dancing movement.

There are over 30 pre-contact examples of the Cox Mound gorget style, found in Tennessee and northern Alabama and dating from 1250 to 1450 CE. The Cox Mound gorget style features four woodpecker heads facing counter-clockwise, a four-lopped square motif, and a sometimes a cross within a rayed circle. It has been interpreted as a visualization of the Yuchi myth of the winds. The four-looped square, or guilloche, is considered by some to be a "whirling sun" motif, or a priestly or chiefly litter; by some, the earth held up by cords to the Sky Vault at the four cardinal points; and by others, the path of life with four stages of maturity. Woodpeckers are associated with the four winds and are medicine birds that can extract illnesses among Muscogee Creeks. The birds are also sometimes interpreted as the four winds. The rayed circle or sun is interpreted literally, a deity or ancestors, council, and/or sacred fire. The entire design could also illustrate the Yuchi myth of the winds.

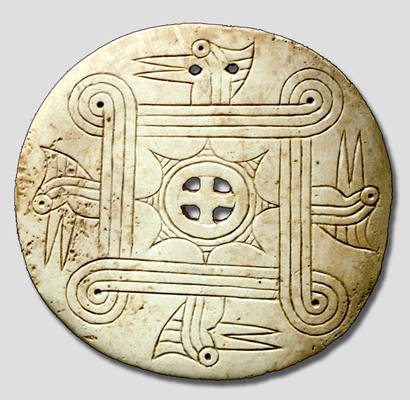
Cox style gorget

A gorget from the Castalian Springs Mound Site in Tennessee features a man holding a mace and severed head. This has been interpreted by some anthropologists as a "flying shaman."

Some agreement can be found in interpreting the cross-in-circle design, which references the sun and the ceremonial fire, fed by four logs aligned to cardinal directions. Another design widely agreed upon is the water spider with a cross-in-circle design on its cephalothorax. Spider gorgets have a widespread distribution but are commonly found in what is now Illinois.

== Historic gorgets ==
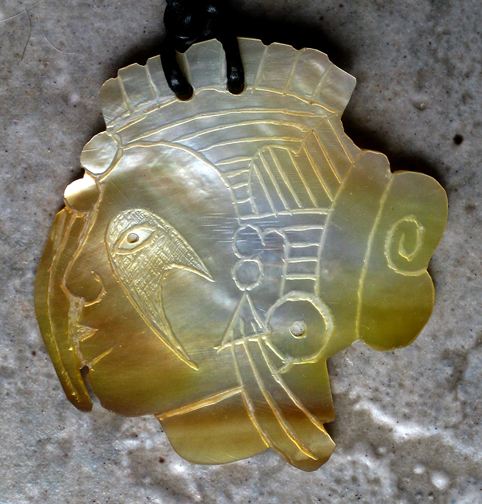
Contemporary gorget by Bennie Pokemire (Eastern Band Cherokee), featuring a Mississippian warrior with a forked eye motif

Turtle shells and stones have also infrequently been carved into gorgets. In the 18th century, metal medallions replaced shell gorgets among Eastern tribes. In the late 19th century, women from tribes along the Colorado River, such as the Quechan wore fenestrated gorgets made from bivalve shells and strung on vegetal cordage.

== Contemporary ==
Shell carving is experiencing a revival among Southeastern tribes today. Knokovtee Scott (Cherokee Nation/Muscogee, 1951–2019) studied under tribal historians, traditionalists, and medicine men. Scott carved gorgets with purple freshwater mussel shell harvested from near Fort Sill, Oklahoma. Sandy Fife Wilson (Muscogee) of Oklahoma carves shell gorgets and whelk shell cups, as does Antonio Grant (Eastern Band Cherokee) of North Carolina.

== See also ==
- Long-nosed god maskette
