= Henry Reynolds (cricketer) =

English cricketer

Henry Smith Reynolds (6 January 1844 – 21 April 1894) was an English first-class cricketer active 1872–76 who played for Nottinghamshire. He was born in Ollerton; died in Burnley.
