= Robert L. Hall =

Native American anthropologist

- Born: Green Bay, Wisconsin, US
- Died: Libertyville, Illinois, US
- Citizenship: Stockbridge-Munsee Community and U.S.
- Scientific career
- Fields: Anthropology
- Institutions: University of Illinois, Chicago

Robert L. Hall (February 8, 1927 – March 16, 2012) was an American anthropologist.

== Early years and education ==
Hall was born in Green Bay, Wisconsin. His mother and her family were members of the Stockbridge-Munsee Community.

He earned a B.A. with highest honors from the University of Wisconsin, Department of Anthropology 1950 and an M.A. in 1951 and received his Ph.D. in 1960. In 1951–1952 he was a Thayer Scholar at Harvard University.

== Career ==
Hall specialized in the ethnohistory, ethnology, and archaeology of the Great Plains and Midwestern United States; the beliefs, rituals, and symbolisms of North American and Mesoamerican indigenous peoples, Mesoamerican calendar systems; and the history of Native American-European contacts.

He was a professor emeritus at the University of Illinois at Chicago in the Department of Anthropology, and the adjunct curator emeritus of Plains and Midwestern archaeology and ethnology at the Field Museum in Chicago.
