= Emmons Cemetery Site =

Archaeological site in Fulton County, Illinois

- Location within Illinois today Emmons Cemetery Site (the United States)
- 40°12′52.56″N 90°12′35.93″W
- Cultures: Middle Mississippian culture
- Location: Bluff City, Illinois, Fulton County, Illinois
- Region: Fulton County, Illinois

Site notes
- Archaeologists: Dan Morse, Phyllis Morse

The Emmons Cemetery Site, also known as the Emmons Site, is a Middle Mississippian culture archaeological site located in Kerton Township, Fulton County, Illinois, on the edge of a bluff overlooking the Illinois River to its east. The location was a used as a cemetery and several unique and rare items were found interred with the burials.

== Site description ==
The Emmons cemetery site is located on the top and along the slope of a section of bluff on the western bank of the Illinois River. At the time of its discovery it was owned by Merrill Emmons of Astoria, Illinois, who undertook extensive excavations of the site. The burials were in several small burial mounds located on the lower slope. The cemetery area measures about 50 feet (15 m) square. Eighty three burials were found at the site, most in an extended position and oriented on a north to south axis with their heads to the south, although a few were oriented east to west. Five of the burials were flexed, one was semi-flexed and one was a bundle burial. The burials contained many grave goods, including fifty five examples of Mississippian culture pottery (including some imported exotic varieties), stone ear plugs, copper and copper covered objects, marine shell objects and pearl beads. It is considered a rather rich collection of grave goods by the standards of other local sites. The site is possibly associated with two nearby village and platform mound sites, Rose Mounds and the Fiedler Site.

== Artifacts ==
A variety of grave goods were found at the site, including several rare or unique objects. One such object is a type of ear decoration carved from marine shell and known as a long-nosed god maskette. Only a few of these objects have ever been found, although Illinois has had more finds than any other area. Many archaeologists now associate these items with Mississippian culture political adoption rituals and with the mythological being Red Horn from the stories of the Ho-Chunk and other plains Siouan peoples. A large collection of Mill Creek chert stone tools were also found at the site.

Several exotic pottery samples were found with the burials. These include several examples of owl effigy stirrup necked and hooded bottles and a partial set of conjoined bottles, all thought to have come from or been inspired by ceramics from the Central Mississippi Valley area.

One child burial had parts of two owl wings adding up to a complete right carpometacarpus of a Snowy owl placed beside the arms of the child when the body was interred. The wings had probably been used as fans or for some type of decoration. Similar bird wing burials have been found at sites in Arkansas and other states.

=== Emmons mask ===
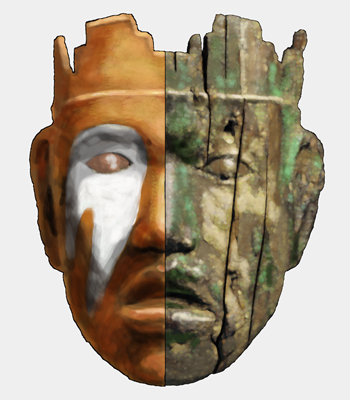
Emmons mask, left side reconstructed

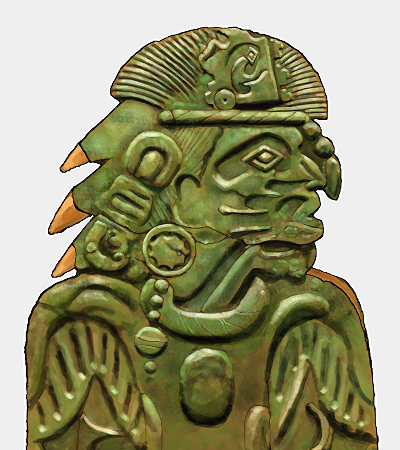
Head of Malden A, showing headdress

Another rare object from the site is the Emmons mask, a fairly unusual piece of carved red cedar believed to have been deposited in the grave sometime between 1200–1400 CE. The piece measures 11.9 centimetres (4.7 in) by 9.9 centimetres (3.9 in) by 5.5 centimetres (2.2 in) and was once adorned with sheet copper and paint made from galena, a lead ore. It is shaped like a human face with a crenelated crown-like decoration on its forehead. The paint encircles the eyes and forms two points down on the cheeks, making the forked eye motif, a design imitating the markings of the peregrine falcon and associated with the Chiefly Warrior Cult of the Southeastern Ceremonial Complex. The piece resembles the small human face that makes up part of the headdress of Malden plate A, an anthropomorphic avian themed Mississippian copper plate found in southeastern Missouri. This copper plate has a birds body but a human head wearing an elaborate headdress which includes what may be feathers and a smaller human face with the distinctive crenelated crown-like structure and a forked eye surround. Archaeologists believe the Emmons mask may in fact be part of such a headdress, and it has holes that would have allowed it to have been attached in such a fashion. A similar piece (including the crenelations) was found at the Etowah site in Georgia, but it is described as a "rattle" and it slightly more resembles the severed heads held by figures on the Rogan plates found at the site by John P. Rogan in the 1880s. A large cache of carved cedar heads was also found in the "Great Mortuary" at Spiro in Oklahoma, although these lack the distinctive crenelations and some of these vary in size enough that some of them may actually be wooden versions of long-nosed god maskette ear decorations. At least three shell engravings from Spiro represent figures wearing similar heads as part of headdresses in the fashion of the figure on Malden plate A. None of the three uses is considered to have been the exclusive use for the objects and the objects may have been used for more than one of these three theories.

== See also ==
- Dickson Mounds
- List of Mississippian sites
