= Wulfing cache =

Set of eight Mississippian copper plates

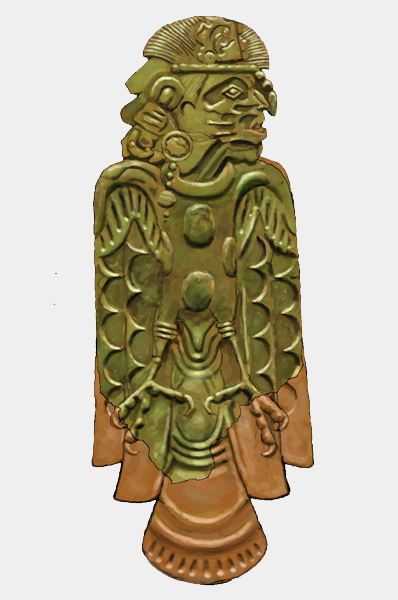
Malden Plate A, depicting a human headed avian deity

The Wulfing cache, or Malden plates, are eight Mississippian copper plates crafted by peoples of the Mississippian culture. They were discovered in Dunklin County, Missouri in 1906 by Ray Grooms, a farmer, while plowing a field south of Malden. The repousséd copper plates were instrumental to archaeologists' developing the concept known as the Southeastern Ceremonial Complex.

== History ==
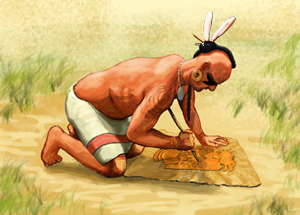
Cahokian artist making a repoussé copper plate

The eight plates are made in the Late Braden style associated with the Cahokia site in western Illinois, the major center of Mississippian culture. They are thought to date to the late 13th or early 14th century. The remains of copper workshops discovered near Mound 34 at Cahokia are so far the only copper workshops found at a Mississippian culture archaeological site. The Wulfing plates depict raptors and bird-human hybrids, with heads ranging from human heads to raptor's heads to double-headed raptors on stylized bird's bodies, with naturalistic bird's claws. The plates were found buried in a field with no known local platform mounds or village sites. They had been considerably used prior to their burial, as each plate shows multiple episodes of aboriginal repair work, including patch repairs and riveted cracks.

Groomes found the plates while plowing his field a little deeper than normal. When he noticed something reflective glittering in the freshly plowed furrow, he found a few pieces of copper. On further inspection, he found the plates buried at a 45° angle with their tail ends up. The plates were stacked together, and Groomes later stated that there did not seem to be much dirt worked in between them. Groomes sold the plates and within a year they had been acquired by John Max Wulfing, for whom they are now named. Wulfing later gave the plates to Washington University in St. Louis. It in turn loaned them to the Saint Louis Art Museum, where they have been on display for many years.

== Individual plates ==
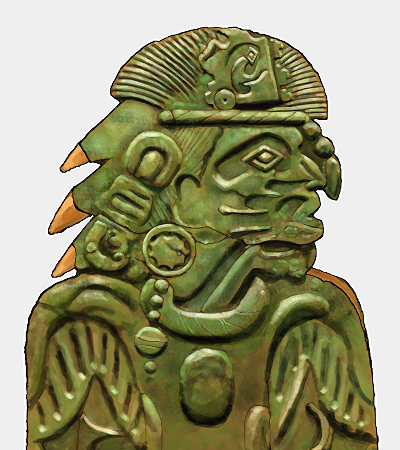
Detail of Plate A headdress

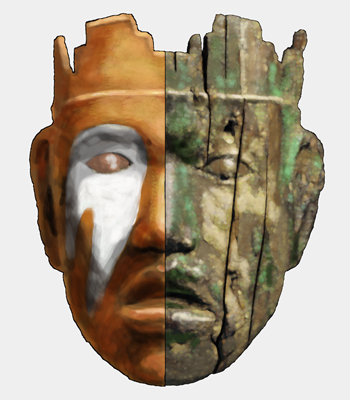
Emmons Mask

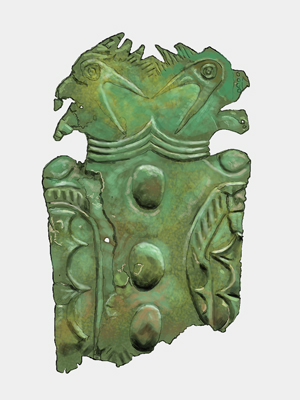
Plate B

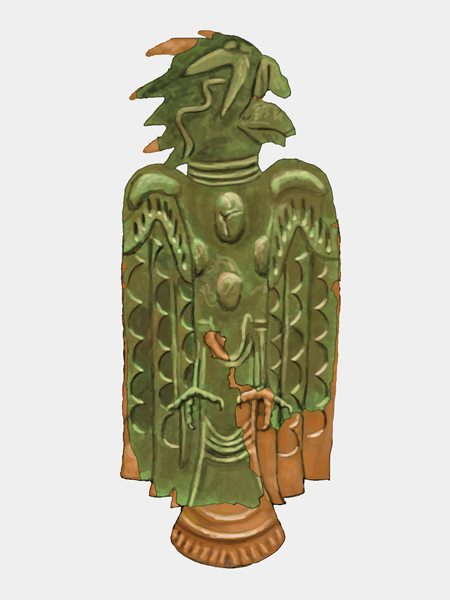
Plate C, with reconstructed tail based on Upper Bluff Lake plate

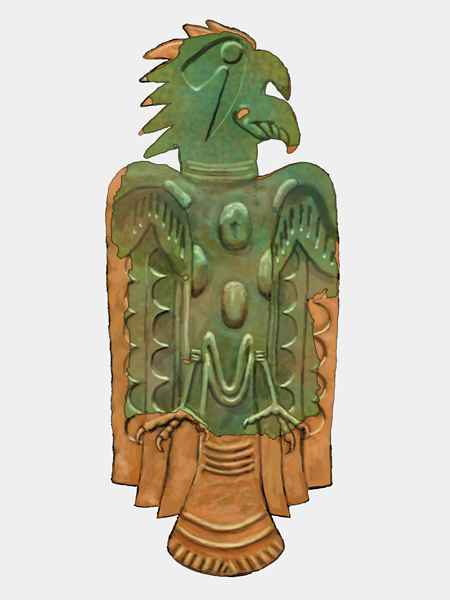
Plate E

The eight plates are designated Plates A–H. Except for Plate B, which has two heads, all of the figures face to the right. All of the plates are missing the majority of their tail sections due to being struck by Groomes' plow. Some of the plates show more expertise in artistic design and some of the plates show more proficiency in the production of the basic copper plates. These qualities do not correlate, as some of the more artistically refined designs are on inferior copper plates and some of the better plates have less sophisticated designs. This suggests that the production of the plates and the embossing of the designs was divided between a trained coppersmith, who turned the raw nuggets of copper into plates, and an artistic specialist who did the repoussé work. This division of labor in craftwork is unusual in aboriginal peoples.

=== Plate A ===
Plate A, the only anthropomorphic human-headed avian plate in the Wulfing cache, measures 30 centimetres (12 in) in length by 13.5 centimetres (5.3 in) in width and weighs 84 grams (3.0 oz). The human head has the Forked Eye Surround motif, Beaded Forelock, ear-spool, Hand Over Mouth motif, and occipital hair knot associated with the "Birdman" of the Mississippian Art and Ceremonial Complex (M.A.C.C.). Among Mississippian copper plates, the naturalistic depiction of the human head of Plate A most closely matches the treatment of the human figures of the Etowah Rogan plates. It also has an elaborate headdress with what may be feathers and a smaller agnathous human face with a forked eye surround motif, ear spools, and a distinctive crenelated crown-like device. This face is similar to an artifact found in a burial in Fulton County, Illinois known as the Emmons mask, a copper covered cedar head with galena painted forked eye motifs and the distinctive crenelated device. This wooden head is thought to be an actual headdress piece worn similarly to how it is portrayed on Plate A, and has holes for attaching it to a headdress in this position.

=== Plate B ===
Plate B is the only two-headed avian of the group, with the heads joined at the neck and looking in opposite directions, one to the right and the other to the left. It measures 25.1 centimetres (9.9 in) in length by 16.1 centimetres (6.3 in) in width and weighs 112.3 grams (3.96 oz). Plate B is the only one of the Wulfing cache to have three centrally located ventral spots and two semi-circular spots on either side of the abdomen. Among Mississippian copper plates this double-headed avian most closely resembles the composition of the 10.5 inches (27 cm) in length “fighting birds” plate found by Warren K. Moorehead in a burial in Mound C at Etowah.

=== Plate C ===
Plate C is the only one of the plates to have a wavy line emanating from the Forked Eye Surround Motif. It measures 33.5 centimetres (13.2 in) in length by 14.5 centimetres (5.7 in) in width and, weighing 124.5 grams (4.39 oz), is the heaviest of the group.

=== Plate D ===
Plate D is the only one of the plates to have only one centrally located ventral spot. This may not have been the case when it was originally produced, as a repaired break in the center of the plate seems to have been fixed by omitting the middle section of the plate. The plate measures 31.2 centimetres (12.3 in) in length by 13 centimetres (5.1 in) in width and weighs 94.5 grams (3.33 oz).

=== Plate E ===
Plate E is 25.3 centimetres (10.0 in) in length by 14.2 centimetres (5.6 in) in width and weighs 63.7 grams (2.25 oz).

=== Plate F ===
Plate F measures 28.6 centimetres (11.3 in) in length by 11.2 centimetres (4.4 in) in width and weighs 61 grams (2.2 oz). It has two punched holes located vertically on the left side of the plate, possibly used for attaching it to another surface or a headdress.

=== Plate G ===
Plate G measures 31.7 centimetres (12.5 in) in length by 13 centimetres (5.1 in) in width and weighs 89.7 grams (3.16 oz). This plate was patched more times than any of the other plates.

=== Plate H ===
Plate H is the most fragmentary of the group and is in two pieces. It measures 22 centimetres (8.7 in) in length by 12.3 centimetres (4.8 in) in width and, weighing 40.7 grams (1.44 oz), is the lightest of the group.

== Malden style plates ==
Many similar plates found in other states are now believed to have come from the same workshop, if not the same artist, as the Wulfing cache. The sites of the discovery of these other plates span the midwestern US. They include the Upper Bluff Lake falcon plate from southern Illinois, the Edwards plate from northern Illinois, the Toul Creek plate from Arkansas, the Reed Mound plate from Oklahoma and the Wilcox plate from west central Florida. They have been grouped together as the "Malden style" for Mississippian copper repoussé avians. Archaeologists speculate that the missing tails of the Malden plates probably looked like the tail of the Upper Bluff Lake plate, whose lower half is mostly intact. The plates also show stylistic links to plates found in burials at Etowah Mounds in Georgia (Etowah plates) and Spiro Mounds in Oklahoma.

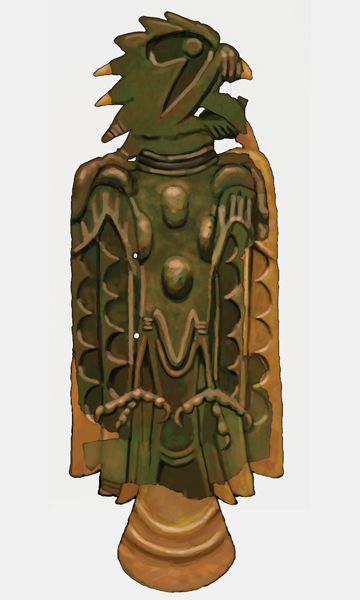
Malden F

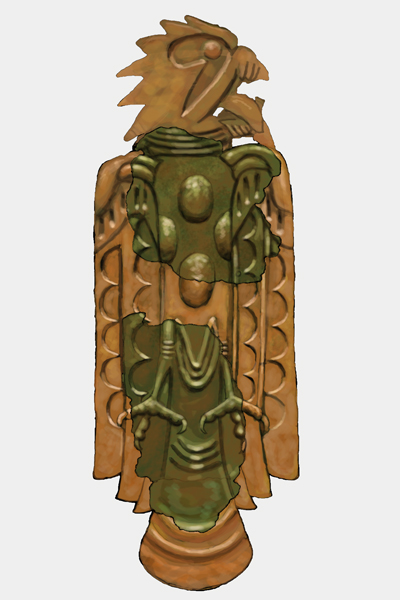
Reed Mound plate from eastern Oklahoma

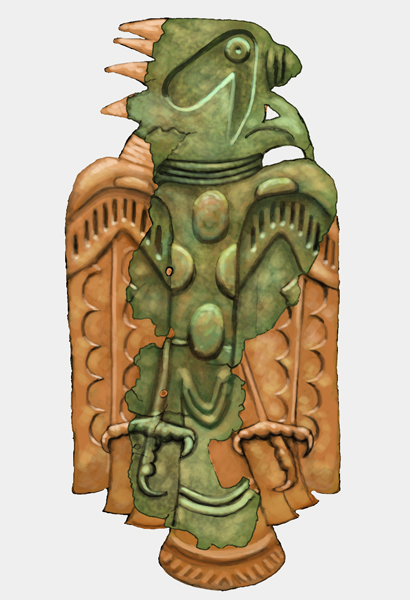
Toul Creek plate from northern Arkansas

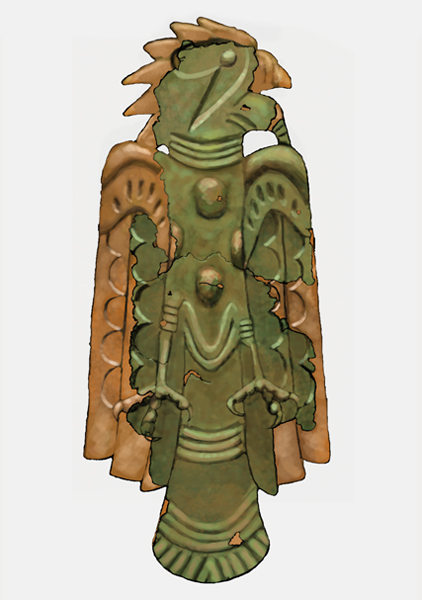
Upper Bluff Lake falcon plate from southern Illinois

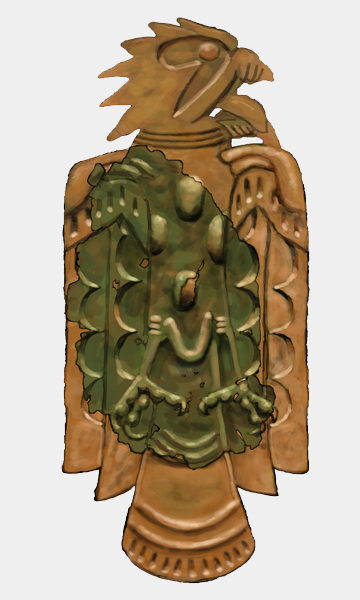
Wilcox plate from western Florida

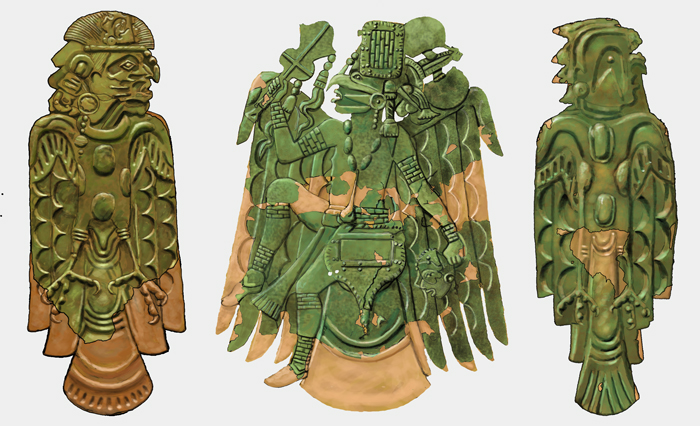
Plates from Malden, Etowah, and Spiro, left hand figure is Malden A

== See also ==
- Old Copper Complex
- Mississippian culture pottery
- Mississippian stone statuary
- Visual arts by indigenous peoples of the Americas
