= Gregory Perino =

American archaeologist

Gregory Herman Perino (February 25, 1914 – July 4, 2005) was an American self-taught professional archaeologist, author, consultant, and the last living founder of the Illinois State Archaeological Society. Perino was considered one of the foremost experts on Native American artifacts. He died July 4, 2005, at the age of 91.

== Early life and career ==
Originally from Belleville, Illinois, Perino started exploring Cahokia and the surrounding Mississippi River bluffs as a teenager. His fascination with the past and his innate ability to locate and meticulously excavate prehistoric cemeteries and burial mounds soon led him into a career as a self-taught professional archaeologist, first with the Gilcrease Museum in Tulsa, Oklahoma; then with the Foundation for Illinois Archeology in Kampsville, Illinois; and finally with the Museum of the Red River in Idabel, Oklahoma.

Perino is perhaps best known for his guidebooks for North American projectile points. In Illinois, he is well known for his numerous excavations of Middle and Late Woodland, and Mississippian mortuary sites in the Illinois, Mississippi, and Kaskaskia River valleys. However, his earlier work at Cahokia is of equal importance. His 1956 Gilcrease Institute excavations into Mound 34 uncovered a series of unusual artifacts and deposits from a copper workshop, that was subsequently lost for 60 years but rediscovered in 2010. It is the only known copper workshop to be found at a Mississippian site. Perinos many contributions to Illinois archaeology are well documented through his routinely published reports on discoveries. For Gregory Perino's enduring contributions to Illinois archaeology, he was accorded the IAS Public Service Award.

== Legacy ==
His most important contributions were to artifact typology, mound construction and use, and mortuary practices. His works on artifact typology are well known, especially where projectile points are concerned.

Perino's contributions to our understanding of material culture also include exceptional specimens such as the bone scepter from the Lawrence Gay mound, the cache of North preforms from the North site, and the copper object and beaver effigy pipe from the Bedford Mounds.

As illustrated by his many profile and plan-view maps, Perino documented mound structure and provided insights into mound construction and uses, especially the construction and function of log tombs in Middle Woodland mounds. He provided detailed descriptions of burial contexts and, in turn, enhanced the understanding of mortuary practices.

=== Selective Publications by Greg Perino ===
- Perino, Gregory 1954, The Titterington Focus - Red Ochre. In: Central States Archaeological Journal 1(1): 15 - 17.
- Perino, Gregory 1960, The Plaza Design in Arkansas. Central States Archaeological Journal 7(4):146–150.
- Perino, Gregory 1961, Tentative classification of plummets in the lower Illinois River Valley. Thomas Gilcrease Foundation, Tulsa.
- Perino, Gregory 1963, Tentative Classification of Two Projectile Points and One Knife from West-Central Illinois. Central States Archaeological Journal 10(3):95-100.
- Perino, Gregory 1966, The Banks Village Site, Crittenden County, Arkansas. Memoir, Missouri Archaeological Society No.4, Columbia, Missouri.
- Perino, Gregory 1967, The Cherry Valley Mounds, Cross County, Arkansas & Banks Mound #3, Crittenden County Arkansas. Central States Archaeological Societies, East St. Louis, Missouri.
- Perino, Gregory 1968, Guide to the Identification of Certain American Indian Projectile Points. Oklahoma Anthropological Society, Special Bulletin No. 3.
- Perino, Gregory 1969, North Points or Blades? Central States Archaeological Journal 16(4):184-187.
- Perino, Gregory & Mary Good 1970, A Guide to Projectile Point Types found in Oklahoma. Tulsa Archaeological Society and the Thomas Gilcrease Institute of American History and Art.
- Perino, Gregory 1971, Guide to the Identification of Certain American Indian Projectile Points. Oklahoma Anthropological Society, Special Bulletin No. 4.
- Perino, Gregory 1971,"The Lundy Site (34CG15), Craig County, Northeast Oklahoma" Bulletin of the Oklahoma Anthropological Society Vol. 20.
- Perino, Gregory & Goode, Mary Elizabeth 1971, "The Will Rogers State Park: (34RO10).” Bulletin of the Oklahoma Anthropological Society Vol.XX.
- Perino, Gregory 1972, An historical cultural assessment of the proposed Birch Reservoir, Osage County, Oklahoma. Potsherd Press. Idabel, Oklahoma.
- Perino, Gregory 1973, The Late Woodland Component at the Peter Klunk Site, Calhoun County, Illinois. Bulletin 9, Illinois Archaeological Survey, Springfield.
- Perino, Gregory 1973, Artifacts Made from Tabular Flint. Central States Archaeological Journal. 20 (2): 60–65.
- Perino, Gregory 1975, The Apple Creek Point. Central States Archaeological Journal 22(2):50-51.
- Perino, Gregory 1976, The Cossatot River Point. Central States Archaeological Journal 23(3):126-128.
- Perino, Gregory 1977, The Mahaffey Point. Central States Archaeological Journal 24(4):164-166.
- Perino, Gregory, Jerry Caffey, Mary E. Good, Marshall Gettys & Paul W. Parmalee 1980, The Eufaula Lake Project: a cultural resource survey & assessment. Museum of the Red River. Idabel Oklahoma.
- Perino, Gregory 1981, Archeological Investigations at the Roden Site, (34MC215), McCurtain County, Oklahoma. Publication No. 1. Potsherd Press, Museum of the Red River, Idabel, Oklahoma.
- Perino, Gregory 1981, Archaeological Investigations at the Mahafey Site (34HC1) Hugo Reservoir, Choctaw County, Oklahoma: a report of the excavations and analysis made under contract no. DACW56-77-C-0129 from the U. S. Army Corps of Engineers, Tulsa District.
- Perino, Gregory 1983, Archaeological research at the Bob Williams site (41RR16), red River County, Texas. Potsherd Press. Idabel Oklahoma.
- Perino, Gregory 1985, Selected Preforms, Points and Knives of the North American Indians.Vol. 1. Points and Barbs Press, 1509 Cleveland, Idabel, Oklahoma 74745.
- Perino, Gregory 1991, Selected Preforms, Points and Knives of the North American Indians. Vol. 2. Points and Barbs Press, 1509 Cleveland, Idabel, Oklahoma 74745.
