= Muscogee mythology =

Muscogee mythology (previously referred to by its exonym "Creek") is related to a Muscogee tribe who are originally from the southeastern United States, also known by their original name Mvskoke (or Muskogee), the name they use to identify themselves today. Mvskoke is their name in traditional spelling. Modern Muscogees live primarily in Oklahoma, Alabama, Georgia, and Florida. Their language, Mvskoke, is a member of the Eastern branch of the Muskogean language family. The Seminole are close kin to the Mvskoke and speak an Eastern Muskogean language as well. The Muscogee were considered one of the Five Civilized Tribes.

== History ==
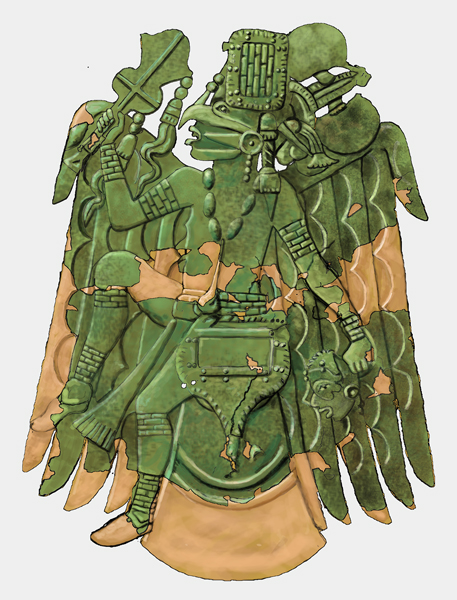
Illustration of a S.E.C.C. Falcon Dancer based on a Rogan plate from Etowah in northern Georgia

The early historic Muscogee were probably descendants of the Mississippian culture peoples who lived along the Tennessee River, in what is now modern Tennessee and Alabama, and possibly related to the Utinahica of southern Georgia. More of a loose confederacy than a single tribe, the Mvskoke lived in autonomous villages in river valleys throughout what are today the states of Tennessee, Georgia, and Alabama also consisted of many ethnic groups speaking several distinct languages, such as the Hitchiti, Alabama, and Coushatta. Those who lived along the Ocmulgee River and the Oconee River were called "Creek Indians" by British traders from South Carolina; eventually the name was applied to all of the various natives of creek towns, becoming increasingly divided between the Lower Towns of the Georgia frontier on the Chattahoochee River (see Apalachicola Province), Ocmulgee River, and Flint River and the Upper Towns of the Alabama River Valley.

The Lower Towns included Coweta, Cusseta (Kasihta, Cofitachequi), Upper Chehaw (Chiaha), Hitchiti, Oconee, Ocmulgee, Okawaigi, Apalachicola, Yamasee (Altamaha), Ocfuskee, Sawokli, and Tamali. The Upper Towns included Tuckabatchee, Abihka, Coosa (Kusa; the dominant people of East Tennessee and North Georgia during the Spanish explorations), Itawa (original inhabitants of the Etowah Indian Mounds), Hothliwahi (Ullibahali), Hilibi, Eufaula, Wakokai, Atasi, Alibamu, Coushatta (Koasati; they had absorbed the Kaski/Casqui and the Tali), and Tuskegee ("Napochi" in the de Luna chronicles).

Cusseta (Kasihta) and Coweta are the two principal towns of the Muscogee Nation to this day. Traditionally the Cusseta and Coweta bands are considered to the earliest members of the Muscogee Nation.

== Creation ==
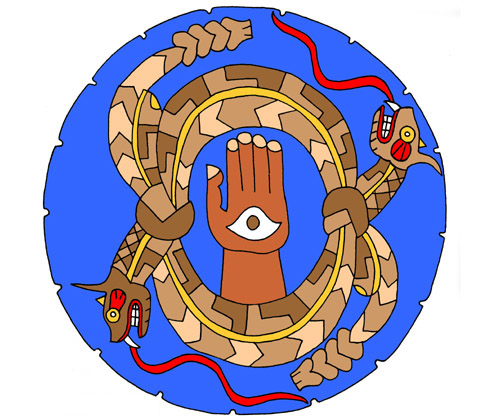
Several S.E.C.C. Motifs on a ceremonial stone palette found at the Moundville Archaeological Site in Moundville, Alabama

Many Muscogee creation stories revolve around how human beings arrived on the earth rather than the earth's origins. Muscogee creation stories differ among tribal groups that became grouped colonially by language similarities, but stories from Kasihta, Kasihta-Chickasaw-Coweta, and Coweta origins all include humans emerging from beneath the earth in the West and journeying to the East. Muscogee creation stories reference Hesaketvmesē (meaning "Maker of Breath" or "the One Above who holds life's breath"; pronounced Hisa'kita immi'si), a solar deity also called Epohfvnkv ("the Creator" or "the One Above us"), who spoke to and guided the Muscogee on their journeys.

In Muscogee beliefs, the cosmos is divided into three worlds: The Upper world, primarily home to Maker of Breath, the Sun, the Moon, and Thunder, The Middle World, inhabited by humans, and the Lower World, notably occupied by the creature known as the Tie Snake or the Horned Serpent. The Middle World is the balance between the order and chaos between the Upper and Lower Worlds.

== Legends ==
In Muscogee legends, the Tie Snake (Creek: ue-pucase) and the Horned Serpent are underwater serpents seen frequently as a chaotic figure. The two creatures are sometimes interpreted to be interchangeable but the Horned Serpent is larger. Across different legends, key points of the Tie Snake and Horned Serpent origin stories involve one of two hunters eating prohibited food, causing them to transform overnight into a snake. This story signals the importance of respecting the cosmic balance between the worlds.

Another significant figure in Muscogee mythology is Corn Woman (Vce-Hoktē or Vce-Este), whose origin varies across legends. One version tells the tale of corn falling from a woman's feet after she rubbed them together. In another, corn poured out of Corn Woman's thigh after she scratched it. Many of the legends end in the Corn Woman sacrificing herself to allow corn crops to grow. The legend of Corn Woman symbolizes how life comes from death and women's fertility.

== See also ==
- Choctaw mythology
