= Mound 34 =

Mound at Cahokia Mounds in Illinois

- Location within Illinois today
- 38°39′39.06″N 90°3′24.41″W
- Cultures: Middle Mississippian culture
- Location: Collinsville, Illinois, Madison County, Illinois, USA
- Region: Madison County, Illinois

Site notes
- Architectural styles: platform mound, copper workshop
- Excavation dates: 1950, 1956, 1999-2010,
- Archaeologists: James B. Griffin, Albert Spaulding, Gregory Perino

Mound 34 is a small platform mound located roughly 400 metres (1,300 ft) to the east of Monks Mound at Cahokia Mounds near Collinsville, Illinois. Excavations near Mound 34 from 2002 to 2010 revealed the remains of a copper workshop, although the one of a kind discovery had been found in the late 1950s by archaeologist Gregory Perino, but lost for 60 years. It is so far the only remains of a copper workshop found at a Mississippian culture archaeological site.

== Construction sequence ==
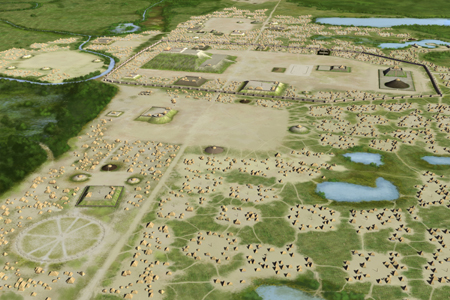
The Ramey Plaza lies to the east of Monk's Mound, at the top edge of the illustration.

From the Emergent Mississippian period (beginning approximately 800 CE) to the Stirling Phase (1000 to 1200 CE) the location was a village site with multiple houses, pit features, extensive midden deposits, a copper worskop, and a large structure (possibly as large as 10 metres (33 ft) by 6 metres (20 ft)) with a centrally located hearth. Early in the Moorehead Phase (1200 - 1275 CE) the entire area east of Cahokia saw an intensive construction episode. The village area and all of its structures was razed and the "Ramey Plaza" and its associated mounds was built over it. This plaza and its twenty associated mounds are the second largest such grouping at the Cahokia site, after the Grand Plaza area which includes Monks Mound and is encircled by the palisade. Mound 34 lies at the northern end of a string of mounds that define the western edge of the Ramey plaza. This construction required the leveling of the area and the removal of much of the village midden that had accumulated over the previous two centuries of occupation, up to 2 feet (0.61 m) in some areas. This removed midden material, along with nearby earth from borrow pits, was used to build the mounds. Mound 34 was constructed as a low rectilinear platform mound oriented along a north–south axis maintained by the majority of the Cahokia site, and with a terrace or apron along its west, north, and east sides. The mound had a building constructed on its summit, inside of which was a large circular hearth. The mound displayed signs of at least one further building episode during the Sand Prairie Phase (1275 - 1350 CE), when an additional cap of earth was added over the mound.

== S.E.C.C. connections and avian ceremonialism ==
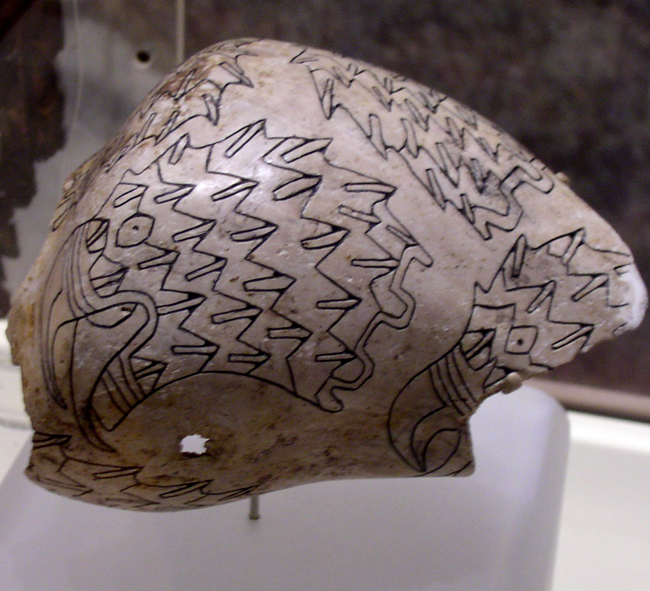
Engraved shell cup with avian imagery, from Spiro Mounds

Artifacts found during excavations of the site included Mississippian culture pottery, beads made from shell, worked copper fragments and raw nuggets, close to 100 distinctive Cahokian style serrated flint arrowheads, and at least one perforated sharks tooth used as a necklace. Several caches of whelk shell cups along with numerous engraved shell fragments were found in excavations of the mound. One cache of six whelk cups and a local mussel shell is considered to be a dedicatory offering deposited upon the beginning of mound construction. Motifs found on the engraved shell and pottery sherds have been connected to the Braden style of the Southeastern Ceremonial Complex, and are considered the earliest known examples of some of the hallmarks of this style. Faunal remains show that the location had been used for feasting activities through much of its history, even before the construction of the mound. Large amounts of avian remains, many the only examples of particular species found in all of Cahokia, show that the site was connected to avian imagery. Many examples of bird wing bones and other body parts found at the site are considered to have been used for decorative purposes instead of food. Raptor imagery in the form of falcon dancers, the Forked Eye Surround Motif and the "Birdman" is integrally associated with warrior imagery, a major theme of the S.E.C.C. Engraved shell gorgets and cups with similar imagery were discovered in the "Great Mortuary" at Spiro in the early 1930s. Radiocarbon dating of Mound 34 has shown that the S.E.C.C. material from the mound was deposited earlier than materials from Spiro and places the origin of the Braden style at the Cahokia site. Other examples of avian related ceremonialism at the overall Cahokia site include two engraved stone tables with birdmen on them and the elite burial found under Mound 72. This burial was of a tall man in his early 40s laid out on an elevated platform covered with a bed of over 20,000 shell beads in the shape of a falcon.

== Copper workshop ==
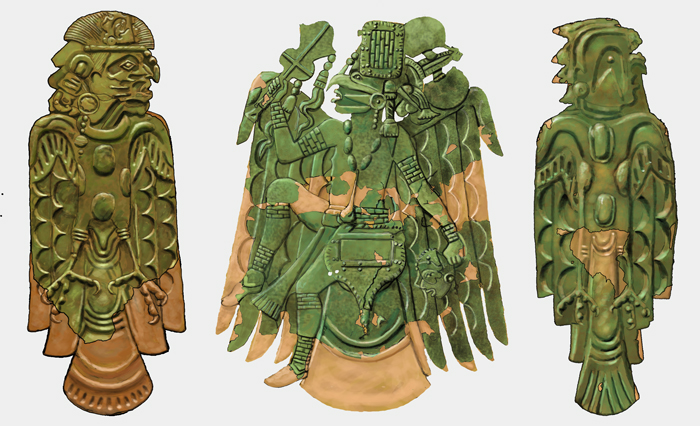
Avian themed Mississippian culture repoussé copper plates

The general area of the copper workshop was first discovered by Perino in the late 1950s and definitively located by modern excavations in the 2000s. Located just to the north of the mound, it consisted of a typical Mississippian wall trench structure measuring 5.45 metres (17.9 ft) along its north–south axis and 4.42 metres (14.5 ft) along its east–west axis. The structure had an internal surface area measuring roughly 24 square metres (260 sq ft) and sunk 50 centimetres (1.6 ft) into the ground. The walls of the building had unusual gaps, now thought by archaeologists to be vents for air flow into the building or to let toxic gases from the heating of copper escape. A variety of raw copper nuggets, small pieces of worked copper, and stone tools for the working of copper were found in the structure, and it is now believed by researchers that the building was used for the processing of raw copper into finished products. The remains of three tree stumps were also found and are thought to have been used to hold anvil stones. Analysis of copper found during excavations showed that it had been annealed, a technique involving repeatedly heating and cooling the metal as it is worked, such as blacksmiths do with iron. Items produced at this workshop may have been similar to copper objects found at other Mississippian sites, such as long-nosed god maskettes, ceremonial earrings with a symbolic shape, thought to have been used in fictive kinship rituals. Many of the stylistically related Mississippian copper plates such as the Wulfing cache from southeastern Missouri, some of the Etowah plates from Georgia, and many of the Spiro plates from Oklahoma are associated with the Greater Braden Style and are thought to have been made in Cahokia in the 13th century.

== Excavations ==
Although noted on early maps of the Cahokia site and tested by Warren K. Moorehead in 1921 and 1922, the mound was not excavated until 1950 by James B. Griffin and Albert Spaulding. Their small excavations produced large amounts of pottery shards, the remains of the first engraved shell cup found at Cahokia, and fragments of repousséd copper plates. In 1956 the mound underwent further excavations by Gregory Perino, funded by the Gilcrease Museum. He uncovered numerous shell fragments and a bed of charcoal he thought was for "ceremonial fires". He also found an area littered with copper fragments, several copper stained posts and described the area as turning green upon exposure to the air. He described the feature as a possible copper workshop. In the late 1990s archaeologists began examining Perinos field notes and artifacts collected from Mound 34 in order to further refine the Mississippian Art and Ceremonial Complex, define its connection to Cahokia, and find the theorized copper workshop. The site of the mound was relocated (poor mapping by past archaeologists and agricultural flattening had made the exact location tenuous), and an extensive series of excavations were begun at the site from 1998 to 2012. Excavations in 1999 discovered several raw copper nuggets and more pieces of worked copper, confirming the location as a copper workshop, the first confirmed find of this sort at any Mississippian site.

== See also ==
- List of Mississippian sites
- Metallurgy in pre-Columbian America
- Old Copper Complex
- Visual arts by indigenous peoples of the Americas
