= Etowah plates =

Mississippian copper plate collection

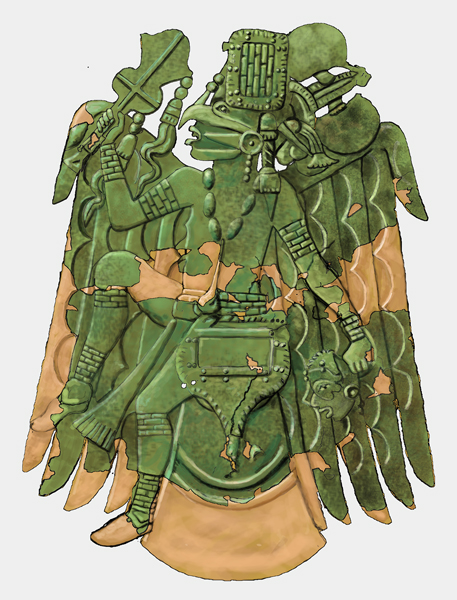
Rogan Plate 1, falcon dancer plate found at Etowah, but believed to be fabricated at Cahokia in the 13th century

The Etowah plates, including the Rogan Plates, are a collection of Mississippian copper plates discovered in Mound C at the Etowah Indian Mounds near Cartersville, Georgia. Many of the plates display iconography that archaeologists have classified as part of the Southeastern Ceremonial Complex (S.E.C.C.), specifically "Birdman" imagery associated with warriors and the priestly elite. The plates are a combination of foreign imports and local items manufactured in emulation of the imported style. The designs of the Rogan plates are in the Classic Braden style from the American Bottom area. It is generally thought that some of the plates were manufactured at Cahokia (in present-day Illinois near St Louis, Missouri) before ending up at sites in the Southeast.

The plates are similar to a number of other plates found in locations across the southeastern and midwestern United States, including the plates of the Wulfing cache found in southeast Missouri and the numerous plates found in the mortuary chamber of the Craig Mound at the Spiro site in eastern Oklahoma. The designs of the plates from these locations, together with the iconography found on artifacts at the Moundville Archaeological Site in Hale County, Alabama, were the basis from which archaeologists developed the concept of the S.E.C.C. beginning in 1945.

== Rogan plates ==
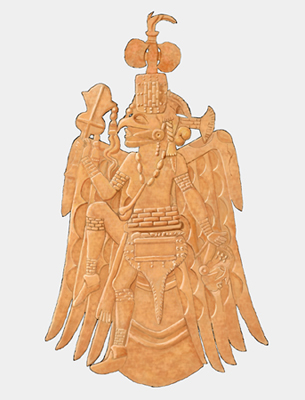
Rogan plate 2, A91113

The two most famous of the Rogan plates, Catalogue No. A91117 (Rogan Plate 1) and A91113 (Rogan Plate 2), Department of Anthropology, NMNH, Smithsonian, were interred as a pair and are very similar to one another. They were discovered in 1885 in a stone box grave by John P. Rogan during excavations of Mound C at the Etowah near Cartersville, Georgia. The first is approximately 20 inches (51 cm) and the second 16 inches (41 cm) in height. Holes in the plates suggest they were once hung as decorations. These plates are stylistically associated with the Greater Braden Style and are thought to have been made in copper workshops at Cahokia (in Illinois near modern St Louis) in the 13th century.

The two plates depict a character known as the "Birdman or falcon dancer", a figure now identified as representing the Upper World in the Southeastern Ceremonial Complex (S.E.C.C.). Each of the figures is in an energetic stance, possibly dancing. They have upraised right arms holding ceremonial stone maces and lowered left arms holding severed heads. On the figures' heads are elaborate headdresses with bi-lobed arrow motifs (identical to copper plate pieces also found at the site) and beaded forelocks. On the front of the headdress, in the forehead area, is a rectangular object, thought by scholars to represent a sacred medicine bundle. Each figure has a long sash hanging from a belt and a motif known as the "bellows apron" attached at the waist. This is thought to represent a "scalp", as the ornament has the same sort of bundle as the figures wear in their hair (although of a slightly different design), attached to a shape interpreted as hair. The faces of the severed heads have the forked eye motif, in contrast to the faces of the figures.

Archaeologist James Brown has argued since the 1990s that many of the attributes of the figure depicted with the Rogan Plate coincide with the cultural hero Red Horn, described in the oral history of Ho-Chunk (and the related Iowa and Otoe-Missouria), Chiwere Siouan–speaking Indigenous peoples originating in Wisconsin.

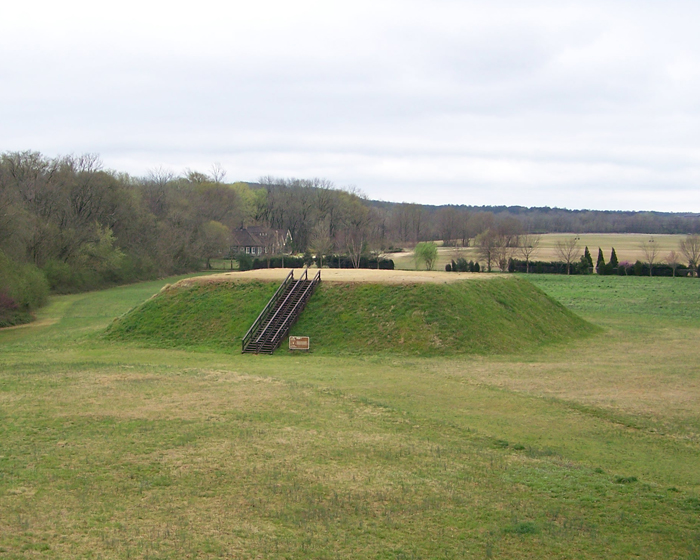
Mound C at Etowah, discovery site of plates

Three of the Rogan plates are avian beings, similar to plates from the Wulfing cache from southeast Missouri, although they are not stylistically close enough to be considered in the Malden style. The first was found in the bottom of a stone box grave with a defleshed, bundled set of bones. Although fragmentary, the avian being shows evidence of having the Forked Eye motif, simple lined collar, and the scalloped wing design of the Malden plates. It differs in that the head faces to the left, the ventral spots on the chest are a different number (3 instead of 4) and are in a different pattern. The legs are also in a different position, sticking outward from the body instead of straight down; and the claws have four toes instead of three. The wings of the Rogan plate also differ from the Malden style in that there are more feathers, the axillary feathers at the top of the wing are represented by a different pattern, and the scalloped markings on the wings are not staggered as they are in the Wulfing plates. A second plate represents "fighting birds"; it somewhat resembles the Wulfing B or double-headed avian plate.

The plates have been associated with the introduction of a new religion into the Etowah area during the Early Wilbanks Phase (1250–1325 CE). The formerly abandoned site was suddenly repopulated and the residents began a new building scheme of platform mounds and elite burials. This new religion relates to the later reported Muskhogean myth of the Cult-Bringer. Anthropologists, ethnohistorians and archaeologists have identified the religion with the S.E.C.C. The Cult-Bringer is an anthropomorphic supernatural being who comes to the Muscogee people and brings a new religion, lives with the people for a time, and imparts his wisdom to them before dying. This being is directly linked to brass and copper plates said to have been imbued with supernatural power. The elite of Etowah based their political power on this new ideology and used it as a mythical charter for their control over their society. Using the themes of physical prowess, fertility, and the afterlife, they identified with the Birdman ideology and displayed this symbolically through the wearing of special shell gorgets and the repoussé copper plates. Since the majority of the copper plates found in Mound C were near the skulls of the buried remains, archaeologists believe they were used as headdresses.

== Other Etowah plates ==
Another batch of plates were found by Warren K. Moorehead during a series of excavations into Mound C in 1925. Many of these other plates are in a slightly different style. They indicate that local artisans had begun production of their own copper plates in emulation of the Braden style.

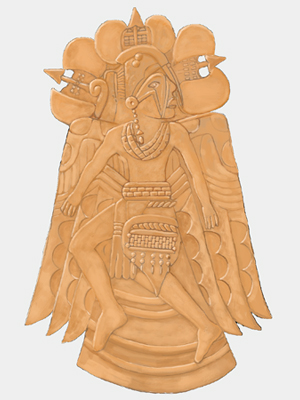
Etowah Plate 3 (Moorehead Plate 1)

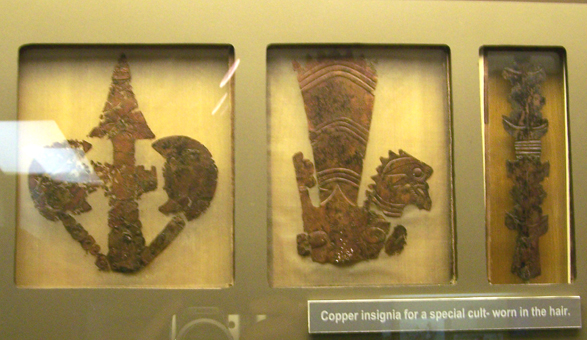
Bi-lobed arrow plates from Etowah, similar to ornaments on heads of Rogan plate figures

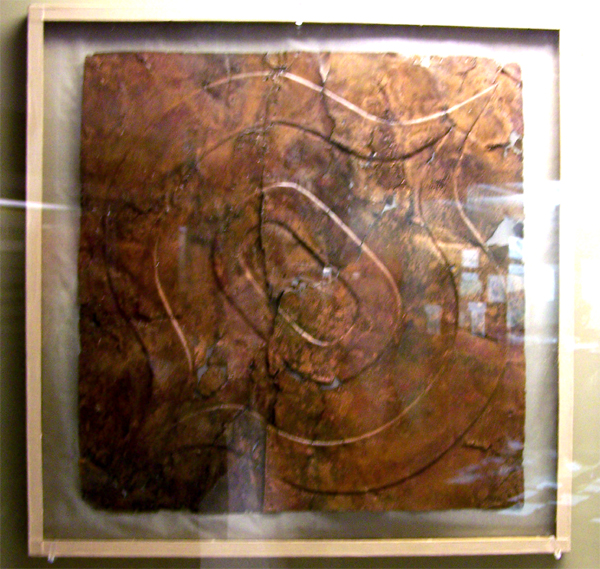
Ogee motif plate from Etowah

== Conservation and display ==
After being stored for many years by the Peabody Foundation, by the 1940s the plates began to develop a malignant patina or "bronze disease". This was caused by their exposure to certain compounds while buried, followed by early attempts to clean them of "limey incrustions" by using even more harmful compounds (hydrochloric acid, the oxychlorides associated with this caused the malignant patina to dramatically worsen). The plates were cleaned in an electrolytic bath and then given coats of protective lacquer. Afterward they were carefully mounted in glass and plexiglass vertical display cases.

== Connections to other locations ==
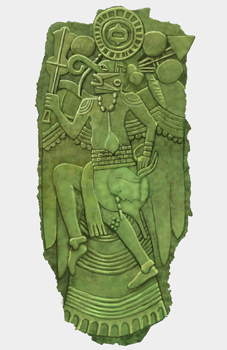
Copper Solar Ogee Deity plate found at Lake Jackson Mounds, Florida

Several very similar plates later found at the Lake Jackson Mounds Site in Tallahassee, Florida are believed to have come to the site by way of trade with Etowah. One plate, the "Copper Solar Ogee Deity", is a 21-inch (53 cm) high repoussé copper plate depicting the profile of a dancing winged figure, wielding a ceremonial mace in its right hand and a severed head in the left. The extended, curling nose resembles a proboscis and resembles another S.E.C.C. motif, the long-nosed god maskette. The figure's elaborate headdress includes a bi-lobed arrow motif and, at the top of the plate, an ogee motif surrounded by a chambered circle. This plate seems to be portraying the same figure as the two Rogan Birdman plates.

Several of the Etowah avian plates and the wing and tails of the Birdman plates have been identified as sharing many similarities of design with the "Peoria Falcon" (Catalogue No. A91507, Department of Anthropology, NMNH, Smithsonian), an avian plate found in the mid-nineteenth century in a mound site near Peoria, Illinois. Archaeologists found that the Etowah plates, the plates of the Wulfing cache in southeast Missouri, and the numerous plates found in the mortuary chamber of the Craig Mound at the Spiro Mounds site in eastern Oklahoma shared many design similarities. They began to theorize the meaning of the designs and to see that the culture that created them had a network across a wide geographic area. Together with the iconography found on artifacts at the Moundville Archaeological Site in Hale County, Alabama, these numerous plates were the basis from which archaeologists developed the concept of the Southeast Ceremonial Complex beginning in 1945.

== See also ==
- Old Copper Complex
- Mississippian culture pottery
- Mississippian stone statuary
- Visual arts by indigenous peoples of the Americas
