= Mississippian copper plates =

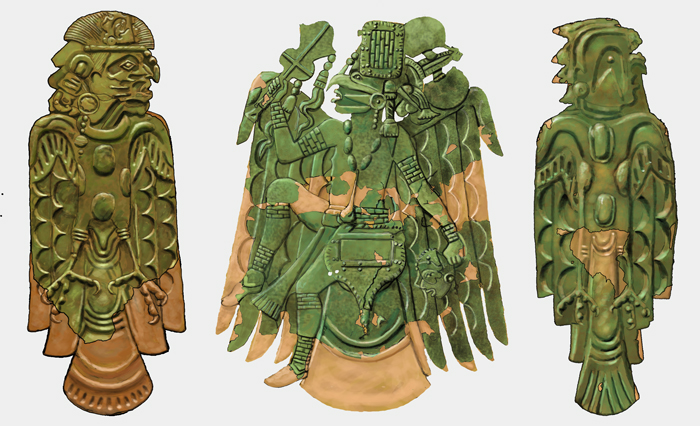
Plates from Malden, Etowah and Spiro

Mississippian copper plates, or plaques, are plain and repousséd plates of beaten copper crafted by peoples of the various regional expressions of the Mississippian culture between 800 and 1600 CE. They have been found as artifacts in archaeological sites in the American Midwest and Southeast. The plates, found as far afield as Florida, Georgia, Illinois, Mississippi, Oklahoma, Tennessee, and Wisconsin, were instrumental in the development of the archaeological concept known as the Southeastern Ceremonial Complex. Some of the more notable examples are representations of raptorial birds and avian-themed dancing warriors.

== Copper in the Eastern Woodlands ==
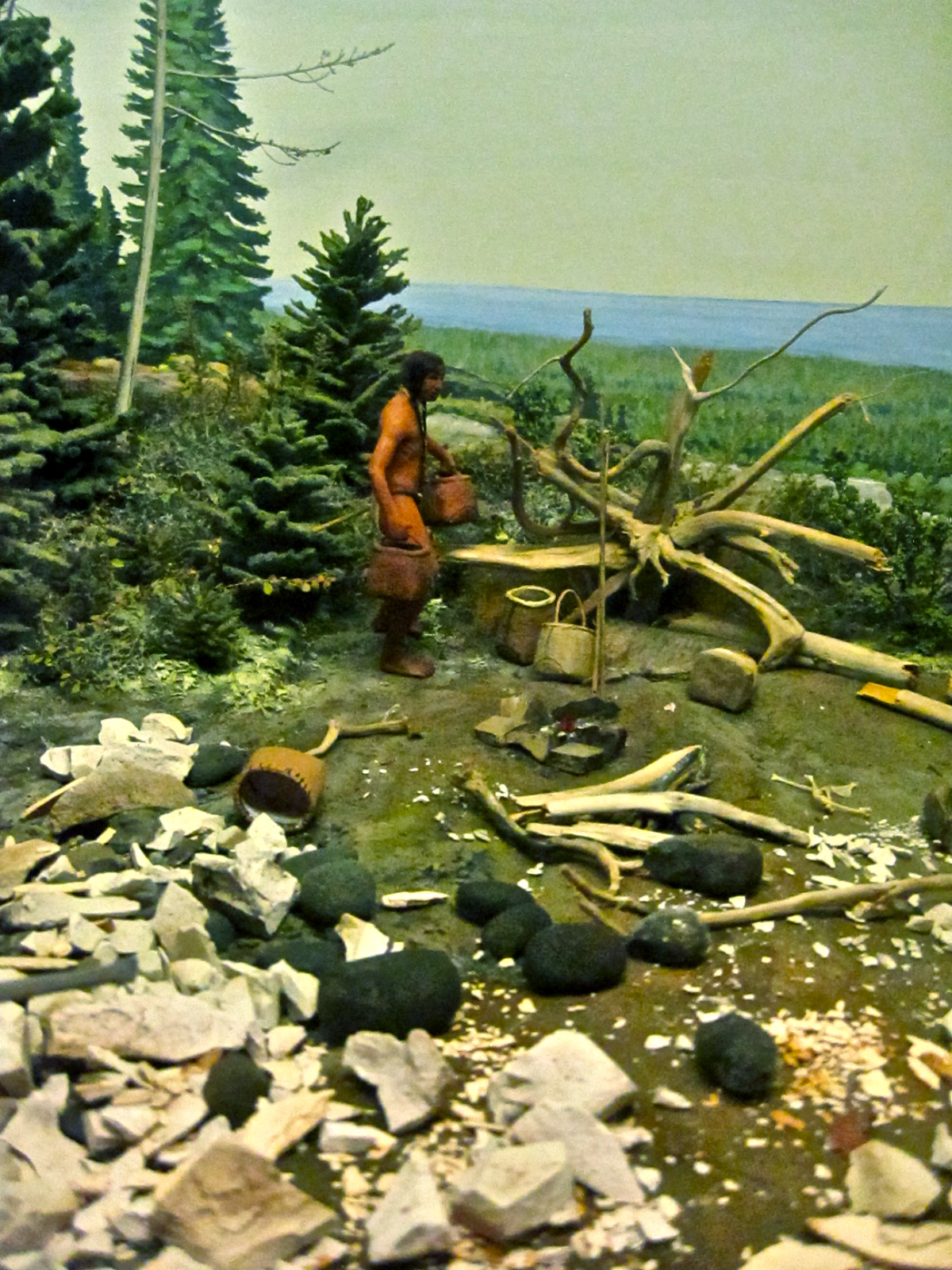
Diorama of Anishinaabe people mining copper near Lake Superior

Copper trade routes throughout the Eastern Woodlands were established during the Archaic period (3000 - 1000 BCE) and continued into historic times. Copper was usually imported from the Great Lakes region; however other sources of copper have been found elsewhere including in the Appalachian Mountains near the Etowah site in Alabama.

For generations the Indigenous peoples of North America pursued copper sources and transmitted the skill of copper's manipulation and preparation as a special material for use in elite goods on to their descendants. Elites at major political and religious centers during the Mississippian period used copper ornamentation as a sign of their status by crafting the sacred material into representations connected with the Chiefly Warrior cult of the Southeastern Ceremonial Complex. These elites used a trade network that spanned most of North America to acquire exotic trade items from far away, trading their own locally manufactured elite goods and materials.

After the collapse of the Mississippian way of life in the 1500s with the advent of European colonization, copper still retained a place in Native American religious life as a special material. Copper was traditionally regarded as sacred by many historic period Eastern tribes. Copper nuggets are included in medicine bundles among Great Lakes tribes. Among 19th century Muscogee (Creek), a group of copper plates carried along the Trail of Tears are regarded as some of the tribe's most sacred items.

== Methods of manufacture ==
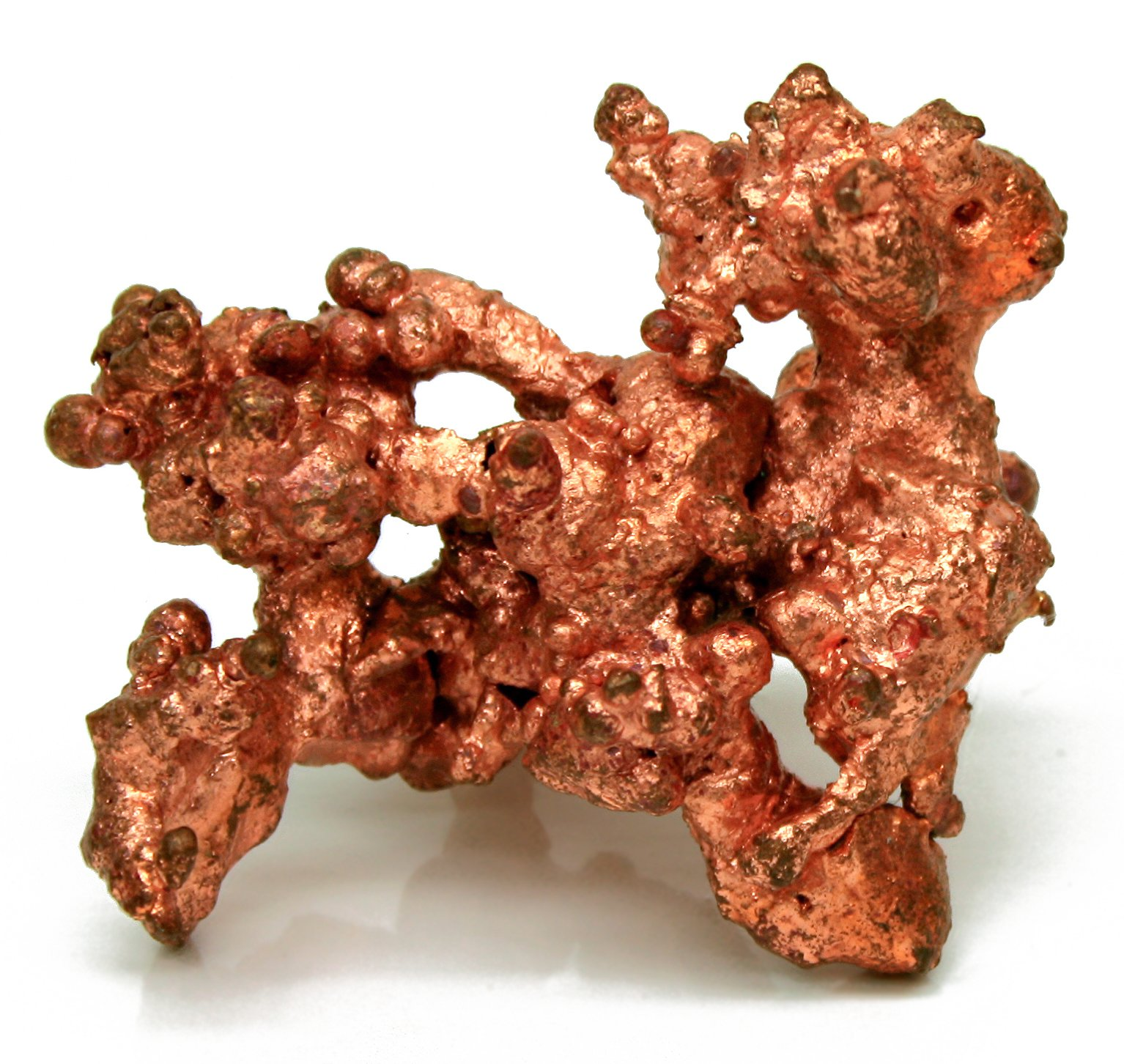
Unworked copper nugget

The native copper, as well as the technique of cold working it, is believed to have come from the Great Lakes area, hundreds of miles to the north of the Cahokia polity and most other Mississippian culture sites, although the copper workshops discovered near Mound 34 at Cahokia are so far the only copper workshops found at a Mississippian culture archaeological site. Researchers at Northwestern's School of Engineering and Applied Science used an electron microscope to analyze pieces of the flat copper sheets found during excavations at the Mound 34 site at Cahokia. The researchers found that the metal had been repeatedly heated and cooled and while it was softened by the heat, had been hammered, a process known as annealing, similar to how blacksmiths work iron. They were also able to determine that the Cahokian coppersmiths had heated the copper in a wood fire to produce sufficient heat for this process. This process of heating and hammering was repeated over and over until a sheet of the desired thickness was obtained and was sufficient to work the copper into very thin sheets. Researchers have also tried different techniques to duplicate how larger pieces were manufactured. They determined that the larger pieces had not been laminated together but had most likely been riveted together with small copper knobs. Researchers were also able to determine that the artisans cut the copper into the desired shapes by bending the sheet metal back and forth until it broke in the desired location.

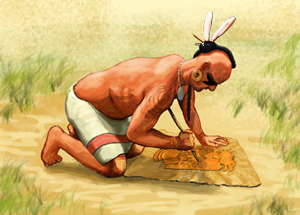
Working the prepared copper plate

After the flat sheets of copper were produced, designs were then embossed into the surfaces probably with stone, bone or wooden tools. Frank Hamilton Cushing, an anthropologist working in the early 20th century, worked out a method for flattening and embossing the plates. He hammered raw nuggets of copper smooth and removed imperfections by scouring the surface with a piece of sandstone. He was then able to duplicate the avian designs by resting the sheet of copper on a rawhide pad and pressing into the surface using a piece of pointed deer antler and pressing with his chest. This produced a sharp thin line that when the plate was reversed resembled the embossed lines of the aboriginal artifacts. This process is thought to be similar in principle to the means used by Mississippian coppersmiths.

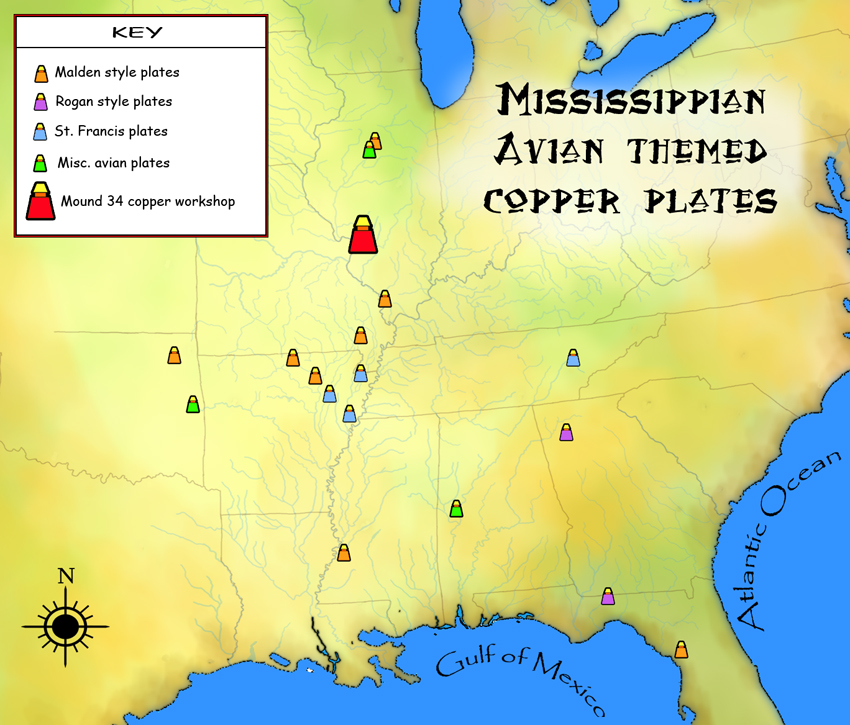
Distribution of avian themed copper plates

== Iconography ==
=== Avian themed plates ===
Avian themed plates are thought to depict aspects of the Birdman, a major figure in Mississippian iconography closely associated with warfare, ritual dancing, and the game of chunkey. Numerous examples of similar avian themed plates have been found in locations across the Midwest and Southeast, from the large cache found in Malden near the bootheel region in Dunklin County, Missouri to others from Mangum in Mississippi, Spiro in Oklahoma, Etowah in Georgia, Lake Jackson Mounds in Florida and other sites in Missouri, Illinois, and Alabama.

==== Cahokia and the Birdman ====
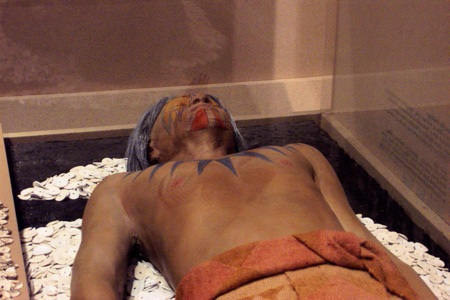
Birdman burial from Cahokia

Years of study by archaeologists, ethnologists and historians of artifacts of different materials found at many sites throughout the midwestern and southeastern United States has led many of these researchers to conclude that the cosmology associated with the avian imagery of this artwork originated at Cahokia (the largest Mississippian culture site, in western Illinois near St Louis, Missouri) between 1100 - 1300 CE. This cosmology was expressed as the "Braden style", a label applied to ceramics, shell pieces, stone statuary and copper artifacts all bearing the hallmarks and elements of the same sophisticated style. These pieces were exported to other centers where they were emulated by regional craftsman and became the basis of local styles, such as the "Craig style" of Spiro Mounds, the "Hightower style" of Etowah Mounds and the "Hemphill style" of Moundville.

Avian imagery occupied a central place in Cahokian iconography, with examples including an incised sandstone tablet with a birdman excavated from Monks Mound and an elaborate elite personage burial in Mound 72 with thousands of shell beads arranged in the shape of a bird.

Although no copper plates other than some small fragments have ever been found at Cahokia, it is the only Mississippian culture site to date where a copper workshop has been located by archaeologists. Excavations of the copper workshops at Mound 34, (a small mound located on the Ramey Plaza east of Monks Mound) indicate copper was worked there. The area contains the remains of three tree stumps thought to have been used to hold anvil stones used for beating out the flattened sheets of copper. However, despite the lack of copper plates, one copper artifact has been found at the site. A copper-covered wooden mace 6.3 centimeters (2.5 in) by 2.5 centimeters (0.98 in) thought to have been part of a headdress was found during surface collections at Cahokia. Several other copper ornaments have been found in nearby locations.

=== Other themes ===
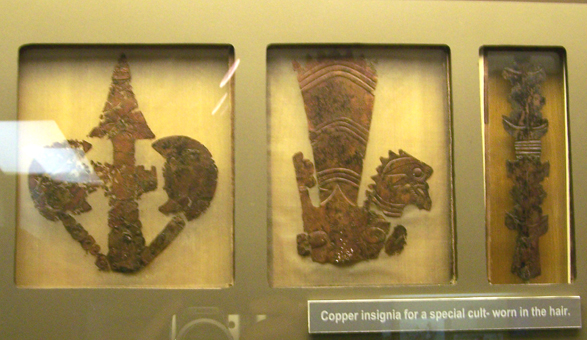
Bi-lobed arrow plates from Etowah

Many of the hundreds of plates found have not been specifically avian themed and come in a variety of other shapes. These include embossed geometric designs, weeping eye motifs, bi-lobed arrow motif headdresses, head shapes with headdresses, and plain sheets. The unique "Upper Bluff Lake Dancing Birdmen" plate was found in the same burial in Union County, Illinois as a Malden style avian plate. Several related examples of bi-lobed arrow headdresses have been found at the Etowah site and the Moundville site. A variety of non-avian themed plates were found at the Spiro site. These finds include copper feather and flame-like shapes believed to have been part of headdresses, a human head cutout wearing similar "feathers", 13 inches (33 cm) square sheets with Forked Eye motifs and concentric circle designs, and several copper covered wooden plaques also with Forked Eye motifs and circles.

== Known locations ==
=== Arkansas plates ===
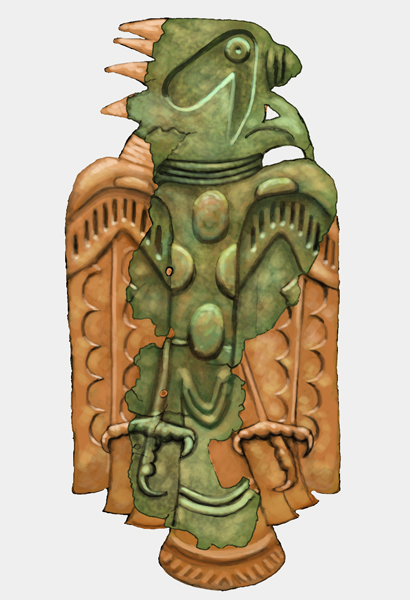
Toul Creek plate from northern Arkansas

A number of plates have been found in various sites in eastern Arkansas. At least three of the Arkansas examples (Rose Mound, Scott Place, and Clay Hill) and two others (a 32.6 centimeters (12.8 in) found in a Dallas phase burial at the Henry Farm Site (40 LO 53) in Loudon County, Tennessee in 1975 and a specimen unexamined by archaeologists thought to come either from the Neeley's Ferry (3 CS 24) or Rose Mound sites in Cross County) have stylistic similarities that indicate they may have all been made by the same artist. Four of the five were found in the St. Francis River Valley area of Arkansas. Researchers think the five plates may represent a composite creature that is part snake and part hawk as the shape of the tail feathers resemble a rattlesnakes' rattle or that the design may represent a hawk in the act of swallowing a snake.

A copper plate found at the Clay Hill Site (3 LE 11) in Lee County, Arkansas has the same chest region design and long narrow shape and distinctive tail feathers as the Scott Site and Rose Mound examples. Although fragmented it is approximately 14 inches (36 cm) in length. It was recorded to be in a private collection in 1978 but has not been seen since. The plate was found in an Armorel Phase burial that also contained a Clarksdale bell, an item of European manufacture that is a hallmark of the 1541 Hernando de Soto excursion through the southeast. This does not date the era for the production of the plate though as such items were often kept as heirlooms for long periods, even many generations, before they ended up becoming grave goods.

In 1910, Clarence Bloomfield Moore found a stylized hawk or eagle plate while excavating graves at the Rose Mound Site (3 CS 27) in Cross County, Arkansas. The plate was 16.25 inches (41.3 cm) and remarkably well preserved, missing only the tip of one wing. The plate is not embossed but merely a shape cut from a flat copper sheet.

In the 1970s, a copper bird 28 centimeters (11 in) in length was found by looters at the Scott Site (3 MS 24), also known as Big Lake Bridge, in Mississippi County, Arkansas. The specimen was located at the back of the head of an extended adult burial, and may have been bent over the top of the head. Eight plain pottery vessels grave good vessels were found with it.

A possible partial avian style plate was found at the Magness Site (3 IN 8) in Independence County, Arkansas along with several engraved shell cups. The plate is a typical head portion with the forked eye, earspool, and elaborate headdress and hairdo known from other examples. As the lower portion of the plate is missing it is impossible to tell if the figure is a dancer or a human headed bird like the Wulfing A plate.

A 8 inches (20 cm) avian themed plate very similar to the Wulfing Plates copper plate was discovered at the Toul Creek Site in Baxter County, Arkansas by several local farmers. The plate was located in the chest area of an extended adult who was also wearing the two limestone ear spools. Other grave goods found in the burial included a marine shell dipper and a 6 inches (15 cm) chert knife. Its whereabouts are currently unknown.

=== Etowah and the Rogan plates ===
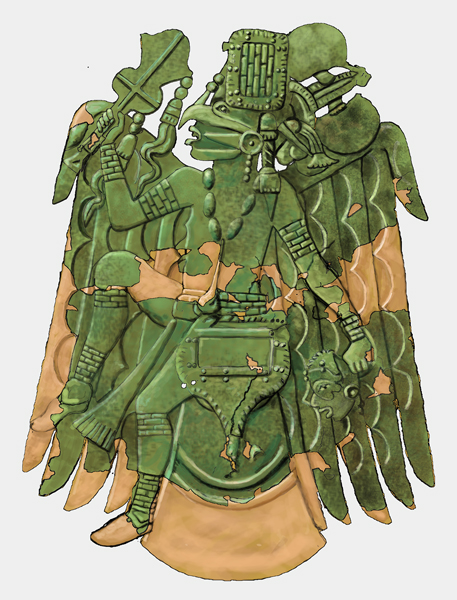
Rogan plate, A91117

The Rogan plates were discovered in a stone box grave within Mound C at the Etowah site by John P. Rogan in the 1880s. Several are very similar to plates later found at Lake Jackson Mounds, and it is believed that the Lake Jackson plates came from Etowah. The designs of the plates are in the Classic Braden style from the Cahokian area, and it is generally thought that some of the plates were manufactured at Cahokia before ending up at sites in the Southeast. The two Rogan plates were interred as a pair and are very similar to one another. The first is approximately 20 inches (51 cm) and the second 16 inches (41 cm). Holes in the plates suggest they were once hung as a decoration. Other plates were found by Warren K. Moorehead at the Etowah site in excavations during the mid-1920s. The other plates are in a slightly different style and indicate that local artisans had begun production of their own copper plates in emulation of the Braden style. These plates, along with artifacts from Spiro and Moundville were instrumental in the development of the archaeological concept of the S.E.C.C.

=== Florida plates ===
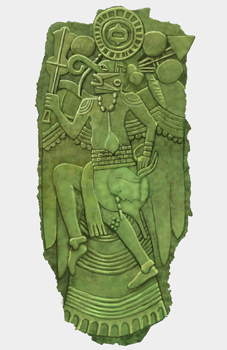
Copper Solar Ogee Deity plate found at Lake Jackson Mounds, Florida

Although at the periphery of the Mississippian world, Florida has been the site of the discovery of many S.E.C.C. associated copper artworks. Archaeologists believe that this is because of the busycon shell trade, the shells being a valuable ritual and high status trade good to Mississippian elites. It has even been proposed that the Fort Walton culture founders of the Lake Jackson Mounds site moved east and founded the settlement in approximately 1100 CE to strategically position themselves in this trade network. Lake Jackson trade for copper pieces seems to have taken place almost exclusively with the Etowah polity of north central Georgia. When Mound 3 at the site was excavated it yielded fourteen copper plates, deposited in the burial mound sometime between 1300—1500 CE. The so-called "Copper Solar Ogee Deity," a 21 inches (53 cm) high repoussé copper plate, depicts the profile of a dancing winged figure, wielding a ceremonial mace in its right hand and a severed head in the left. The extended, curling nose resembles a proboscis and resembles another S.E.C.C. motif, the long-nosed god maskette. The figures elaborate headdress includes a bi-lobed arrow motif and, at the top of the plate, an ogee motif surrounded by a chambered circle. Some art historians have argued that this plate and one of the Rogan plates may represent a female or "Birdwoman" because the breast on the figure protrudes slightly more than it does on other examples, while others have argued that the plate may represent a third gender or "two-spirit" tradition. After the collapse of the Etowah polity in approximately 1375, trade continued for the Lake Jackson peoples, albeit now with peoples located in the northern Georgia and eastern Tennessee area. No longer able to get the elaborate copper plates from Etowah, a local style developed, producing a new style of such as that depicted on the "Elder Birdman" plate, thought to represent the merger of the Birdman corpus with a local solar deity.

Further east and south into Florida were non-Mississippian culture peoples who were involved in long-distance trade of local high status items such as busycon shells for gorgets and yaupon holly for the black drink. The Mill Cove Complex is a St. Johns culture site in Duval County, Florida with two sand burial mounds, one platform mound shaped and associated village habitation areas. Clarence Bloomfield Moore excavated the mounds in 1894 and found numerous copper grave goods, including two copper long-nosed god maskettes and 11 copper plates. The one plate found in the Shields Mound was plain, but several of the other 10 found in the Grant Mound were decorated with an oval central boss and ringed with an oval embossed or beaded line. They measured 10 centimeters (3.9 in)-15 centimeters (5.9 in) to 5 centimeters (2.0 in)-10 centimeters (3.9 in). They had perforated holes for hanging. Archaeologists speculate they were used either for gorgets or headdress ornaments. Analysis of the metal in the plaques has connected them to locations in the Great Lakes region, Wisconsin and the Appalachian Mountains.

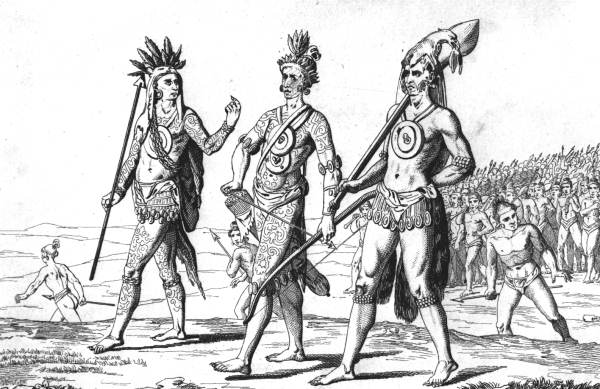
Timucua wearing embossed metal gorgets ca. 1562

A little further down the Atlantic coast was the Mount Royal Mound (8 PU 35), a site occupied on and off since 4000 BCE, and during the historic period a Timucua settlement. Construction of the mound at Mount Royal, began in approximately 1050 CE. In 1893 and 1894, Clarence Bloomfield Moore excavated the mound. Among the copper ornaments he disinterred, Moore discovered a copper breast-place with a "forked eye and blade image", and another plate with concentric circles and lines. The first plate was almost 11 inches (280 mm) square and the second plate was 10.5 inches (270 mm) square.

Located in central Florida, the Old Okahumpka Site (8 LA 57) is a now destroyed burial mound in Lake County, Florida near the modern town of Okahumpka. The site was excavated by Clarence B. Moore in the 1890s. During his excavation he found a burial associated plate measuring 7.1 centimeters (2.8 in) wide by 15.2 centimeters (6.0 in) in length and depicting the lower portion of a dancing figure wearing a sash, kilt, cuffed moccasins, and holding a knife. The design is almost identical to two examples known from Spiro and a site in Jackson County, Alabama, although of the three it is the only one to show a figure wielding a knife. Archaeologists estimate the plate was deposited in the mound sometime between 1100 and 1300 CE. The plate is now part of the collection of the National Museum of the American Indian.

From an unknown location on the west coast of central Florida comes the Wilcox plate, a partial avian themed copper plate showing the middle section details of scalloped wings, tail feathers and a raptors leg and claw in the Malden style very similar to the Wulfing plates. It was discovered somewhere near Waldo, Florida in Levy County in the 1880s, where it was purchased from a local doctor by Joseph Wilcox for the Academy of Natural Sciences of Philadelphia. It has been part of the collection of the University of Pennsylvania Museum of Archaeology and Anthropology since the mid-1930s.

=== Illinois plates ===
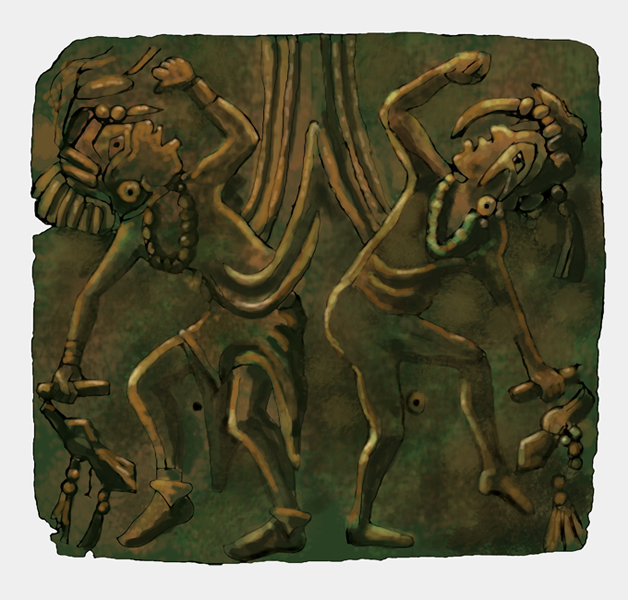
Upper Bluff Lake Dancing Birdmen plate

Outside of Cahokia, Illinois has seen the discovery of many Mississippian culture copper items including copper maces, ear spools, several avian plates, a wooden copper covered mask (known as the Emmons mask), and headdress pieces. Three copper plates have been found, one of them been identified as being from the same workshop as the Wulfing plates and others as having stylistic similarities with the Wulfing, Spiro and Etowah plates.

The Edwards falcon plate is a 37.8 centimeters (14.9 in) by 11.3 centimeters (4.4 in) copper avian plate found at the Material Service Quarry Site in LaSalle County, Illinois. Before it was deposited as a grave good it had its head riveted on in the reverse position. It is one of several plates found in Illinois believed to have been made by the same workshop as the Malden plates.

The Peoria Falcon is a unique avian plate found in 1856 on the shore of Peoria Lake. It is a 7 inches (18 cm) by 9 inches (23 cm) copper plate depicting a naturalistic peregrine falcon. It is part of the collection of the National Museum of Natural History, but it is on long-term loan to the Lakeview Museum of Arts and Sciences in Peoria, Illinois where it is on display.

The Upper Bluff Lake plates are two plates found at the Saddle Site (11U284) in Union County, Illinois in the 1880s, in the same stone box grave. One of the plates is avian themed and the other a unique double birdman design, but still within the corpus of the S.E.C.C. The Upper Bluff Lake falcon plate is a 25.7 centimeters (10.1 in) by 8.25 centimeters (3.25 in) avian themed Wulfing style plate. It has a mostly intact tail, which the Malden plates do not, and has helped archaeologists understand what the tails of the other pieces would have looked like. The Dancing Figures plate is a rectangular 15.5 centimeters (6.1 in) by 16.5 centimeters (6.5 in) plate depicting two Birdman figures holding ceremonial chipped flint maces, possibly dancing, and shielding themselves from a possible liquid or ropelike motif falling from the top center of the plate. Stylistically the Dancers plate has been linked to the Classic Braden style associated with Cahokia and it bears stylistic similarities to Craig A style shell objects found at the Spiro site. Both the plates date from 1100 to 1300 CE. Both of the Upper Bluff Lake plates are now in the collection of the National Museum of Natural History.

=== Malden plates or the Wulfing cache ===
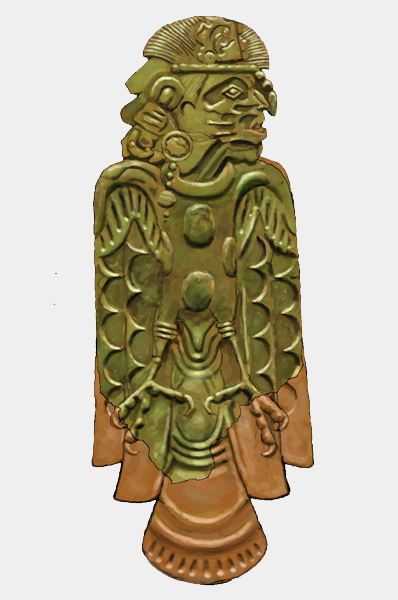
Human headed avian Malden Plate A

The plates of the Wulfing cache, named after an early owner, were discovered by a farmer named Ray Groomes while plowing a field south of Malden in Dunklin County, Missouri in 1906. The eight plates, made in the Late Braden style associated with Cahokia, are thought to date to the late 13th or early 14th century. The Wulfing plates depict raptors and one bird-human hybrids, ranging human heads to raptor's heads to double-headed raptors on stylized bird's bodies, with naturalistic bird's claws. The plates were found buried in a field with no known local mounds or village sites. They had been considerably used prior to their burial, as each plates shows multiple episodes of aboriginal repair work including patch repairs and riveted cracks.

The eight plates are designated Plates A-H. Plate A, the only anthropomorphic human headed avian in the Wulfing cache, measures 30 centimeters (12 in) in length by 13.5 centimeters (5.3 in) in width and weighs 84 grams (3.0 oz).

Many similar plates found in other states are now believed to have come from the same workshop, if not the same artist, as the Wulfing cache. The sites of the discovery of these other plates span the United States from central Florida to northern Illinois to Oklahoma, and include the Upper Bluff Lake falcon plate, the Toul Creek plate, the Reed Mound plate, the Edwards plate, and the Wilcox plate, as well as showing stylistic links to plates found in burials at Etowah and Spiro.

=== Spiro plates ===
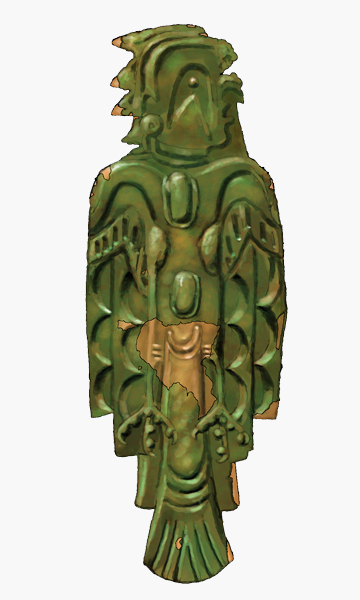
Anthropomorphic human headed avian plate from Spiro

Spiro Mounds is a Caddoan Mississippian culture archaeological site located in present-day LeFlore County, Oklahoma. In the 1930s the only burial mound at the site, the Craig Mound, was looted by locals who used dynamite on the mound to gain access to its interior. Once inside the 10 feet (3.0 m) high and 15 feet (4.6 m) wide cavity the looters discovered almost perfectly preserved fragile artifacts made of wood, conch shell, fabric of vegetal and animal fibers, lace, fur, feathers and copper. The Great Mortuary, as the hollow interior has since become known to archaeologists, was a burial structure for Spiro's rulers. It was created as a circle of sacred cedar posts sunk in the ground and angled together at the top like a tipi. The cone-shaped chamber was covered with layers of earth to create the mound, and it never collapsed. Minerals percolating through the mound hardened the chamber's log walls, making them resistant to decay and shielding the perishable artifacts inside from direct contact with the earth. No other Mississippian mound has been found with such a hollow space inside it or with such large and distinctive collection of preserved artifacts. Among the grave goods were numerous copper pieces, including ear-spools, celts, copper sheathed wooden knives and 265 repoussé plates. One of the more famous of these copper plates depicts a man's head, possibly severed, in profile, with a Forked Eye motif, an ear-spool, and hair styled into an occipital hair knot from which a single feather projects. The plate measures 24 centimeters (9.4 in) by 17.4 centimeters (6.9 in). Another of the plates is the avian themed "naturalistic hawk cutout", which measures 11.5 inches (29 cm) in width. The plate shows stylistic similarities with the Wulfing plates. Some of the other repoussé copper pieces found include eight examples of copper "feathers" that were worn as hair ornaments. Many of the plates found at Spiro are in the "Braden Style" and are thought by archaeologists to have been imported from Cahokia.

=== Other locations ===
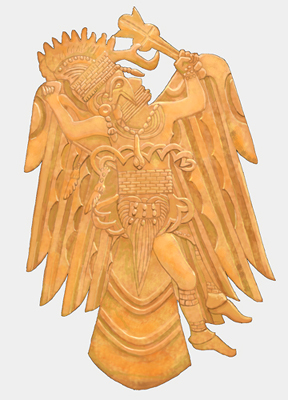
Reconstruction of the plate found at Mangum

Besides the Spiro site, four other plates have been found during excavations at Caddoan Mississippian sites. The Reed Mound in Oklahoma produced a fragmentary Malden style plate thought to be from the same workshop as the Wulfing set. Three other plates were found at the Gahagan Mounds Site in Red River Parish, Louisiana in the early 20th century, along with numerous other copper objects including copper covered ear spools and a matched set of large copper long-nosed god maskettes. The plates were large rectangular plaques embossed with concentric circles or squares and are similar to the Mount Royal plates from Florida. A matching pair of large thin sheet copper cutout human hands were also found at Gahagan.

Two plates were found in a Plaquemine culture site in Mississippi. Three fragments of a repoussé plate with an avian design were found in a burial in the Mangum Mound Site in Claiborne County, Mississippi in 1936 by a farmer who owned the site. When pieced together the plate was about 12 inches (30 cm) in width and weighed a total of 53 grams (1.9 oz). The plate had been reinforced and riveted in several places to protect weak spots in the metal. A second plate was found during archaeological excavations at the site in 1963. The Mangum plates stylistically resemble the Rogan plates from Etowah.

== Other copper items ==
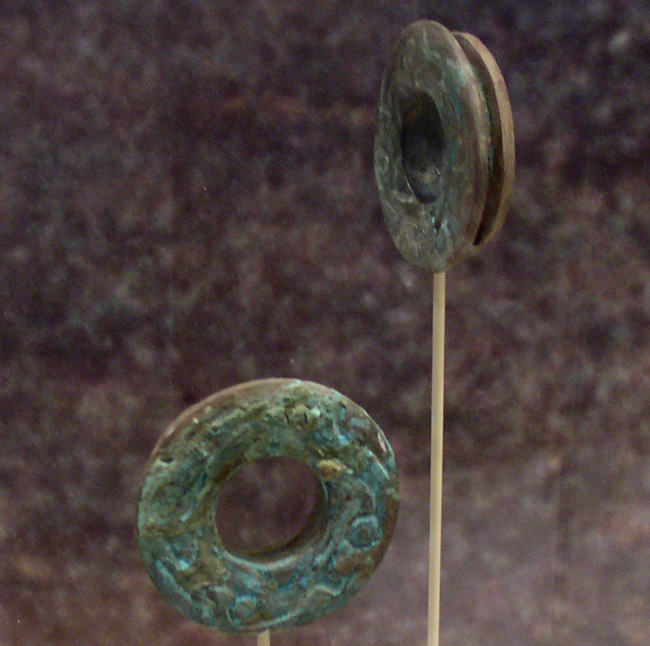
Copper earspools from Spiro

Besides the repoussé copper plates, Mississippian people also created copper axes, knives, gorgets, beads, and fishhooks, as well as wooden beads and ear spools covered in copper. Long-nosed god maskettes, a special kind of ear ornamentation, are sometimes found made of copper. Copper examples have been found at the Gahagan Mounds Site in Louisiana and at the Grant Mound in Florida, each of which produced two of the earpieces. Several copper covered cedar knives were found in the Great Mortuary mound at Spiro. Several matching pairs were found, although of slightly differing lengths, ranging up to 17 inches (43 cm) long. One set had Weeping eye motifs repousséd into the copper sheathing. A variety of copper and copper covered items have been found at the Moundville in Alabama, although no copper plates have been found there. Moundville copper artifacts generally consist of copper covered ear spools and tear drop shaped pendants thought to represent trophy scalps. A unique copper piece was discovered at the Emmons Cemetery Site in Fulton County, Illinois. It is a wooden 11.9 centimeters (4.7 in) by 9.9 centimeters (3.9 in) by 5.5 centimeters (2.2 in) copper covered object shaped like a human face with a crenelated crown-like decoration on its forehead. It resembles the small human face that makes up part of the headdress of Malden plate A (including the distinctive crenelated crown-like structure) and archaeologists believe it was in fact part of a real headdress.

== Gallery ==
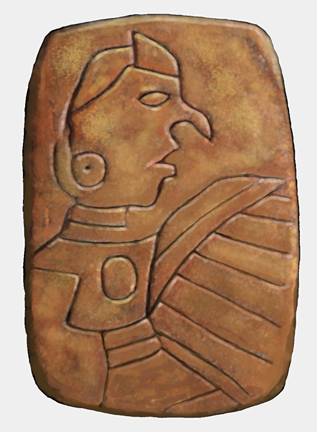
Birdman sandstone tablet excavated from Monks Mound in 1971

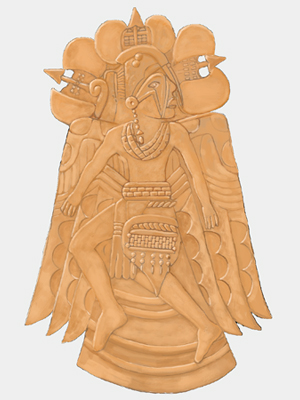
Etowah Dancing Warrior plate discovered by W.K. Moorehead

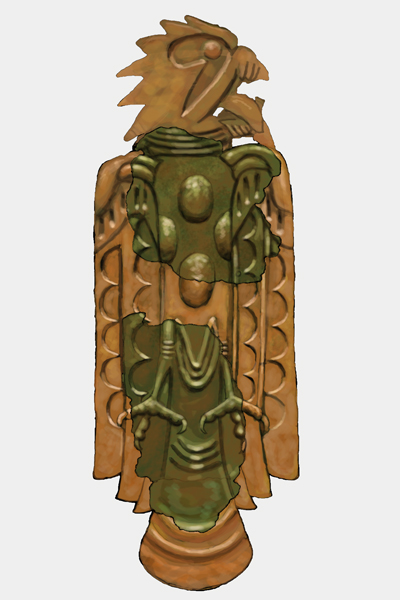
Reed Mound plate, Oklahoma

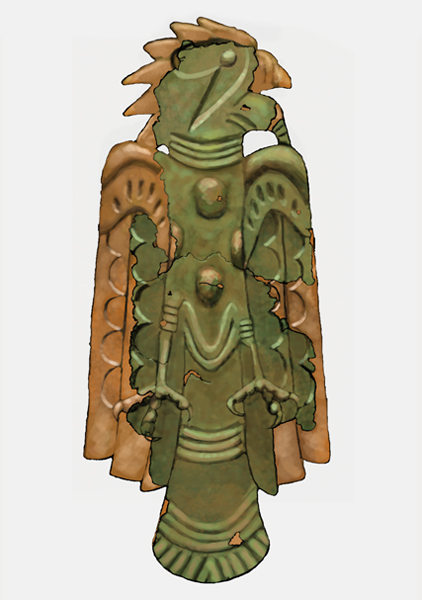
Upper Bluff Lake falcon plate, southern Illinois

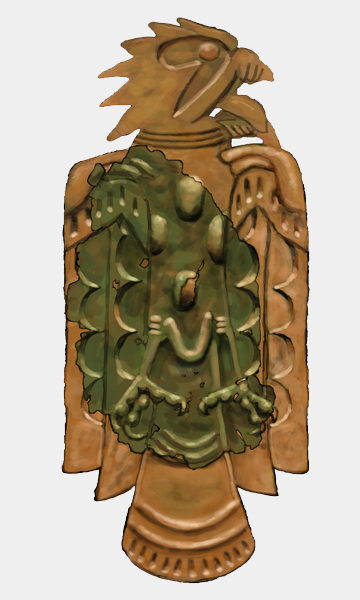
Wilcox plate, western Florida

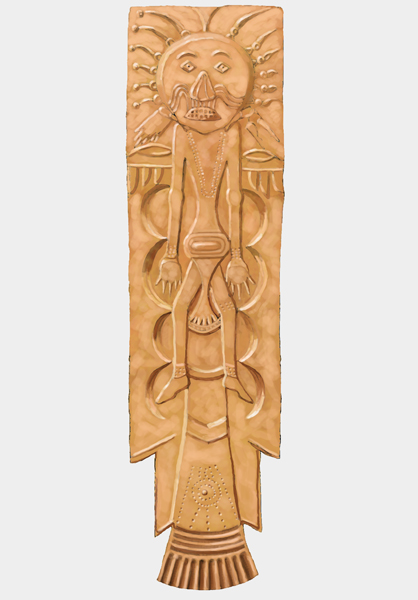
Elder Birdman plate, Lake Jackson site

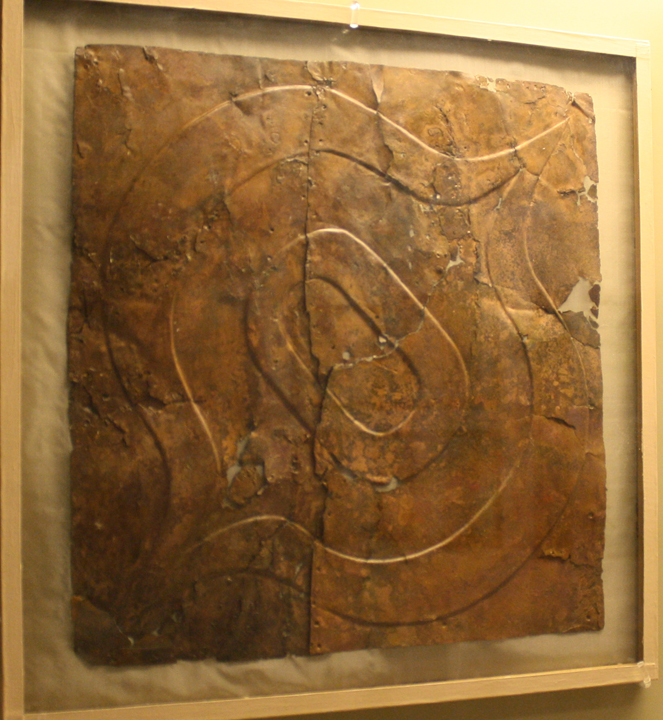
Ogee motif plate, Etowah

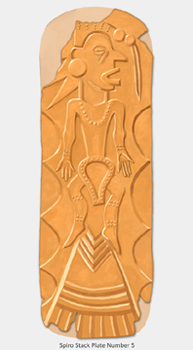
Stack Style Plate 5, Spiro

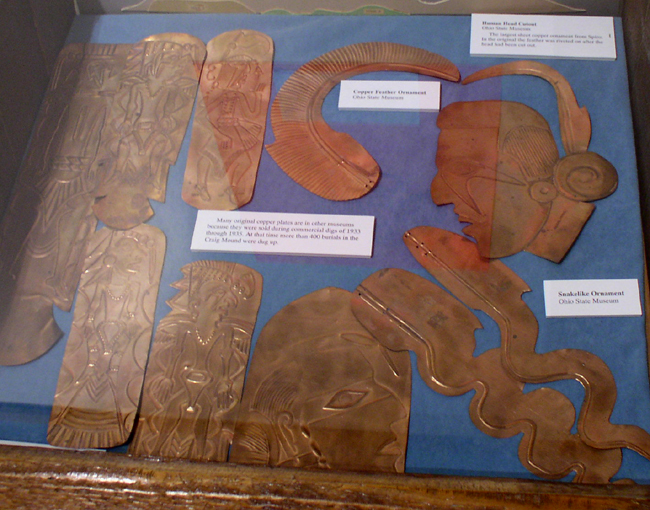
Replicas of copper plates and feathers at Spiro, on display at the site museum

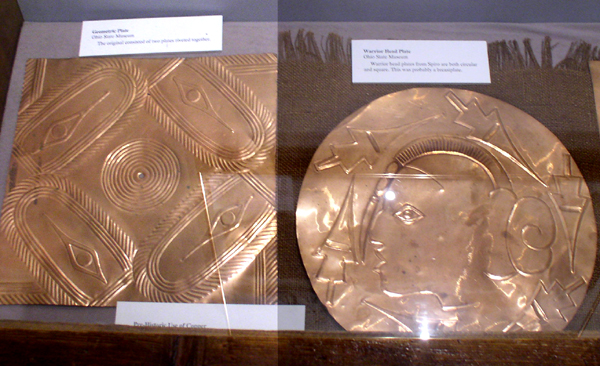
Replicas of copper plates, Spiro

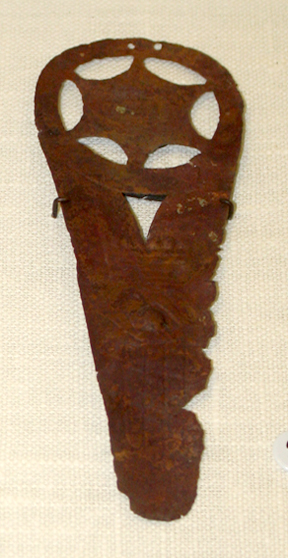
Copper pendant, Moundville

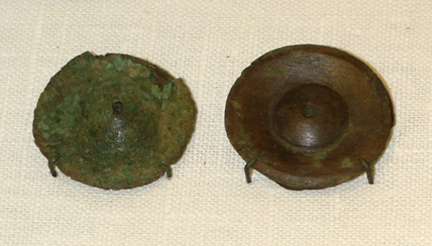
Copper ear spools, Moundville

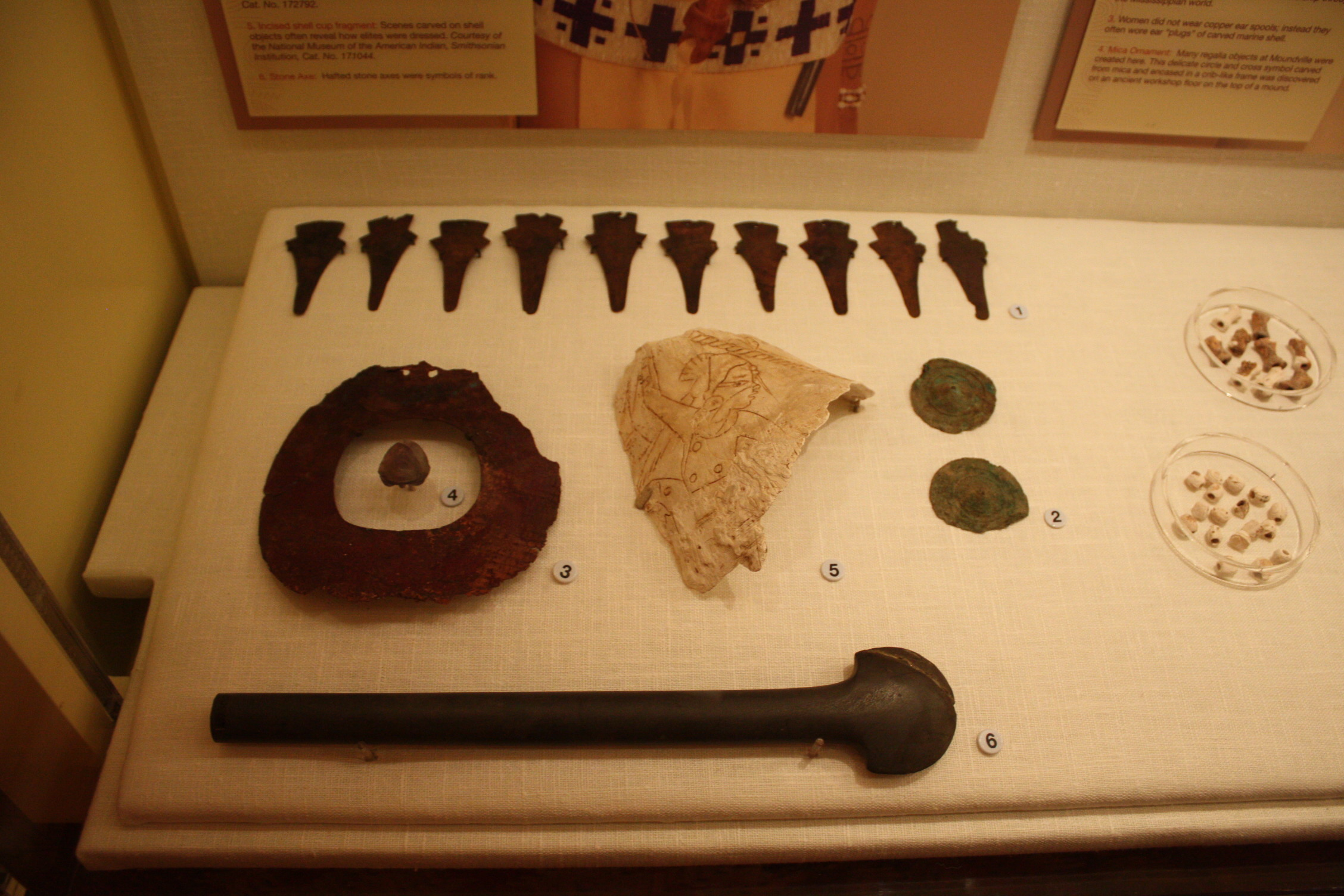
Copper headdress ornaments shaped like maces, Moundville

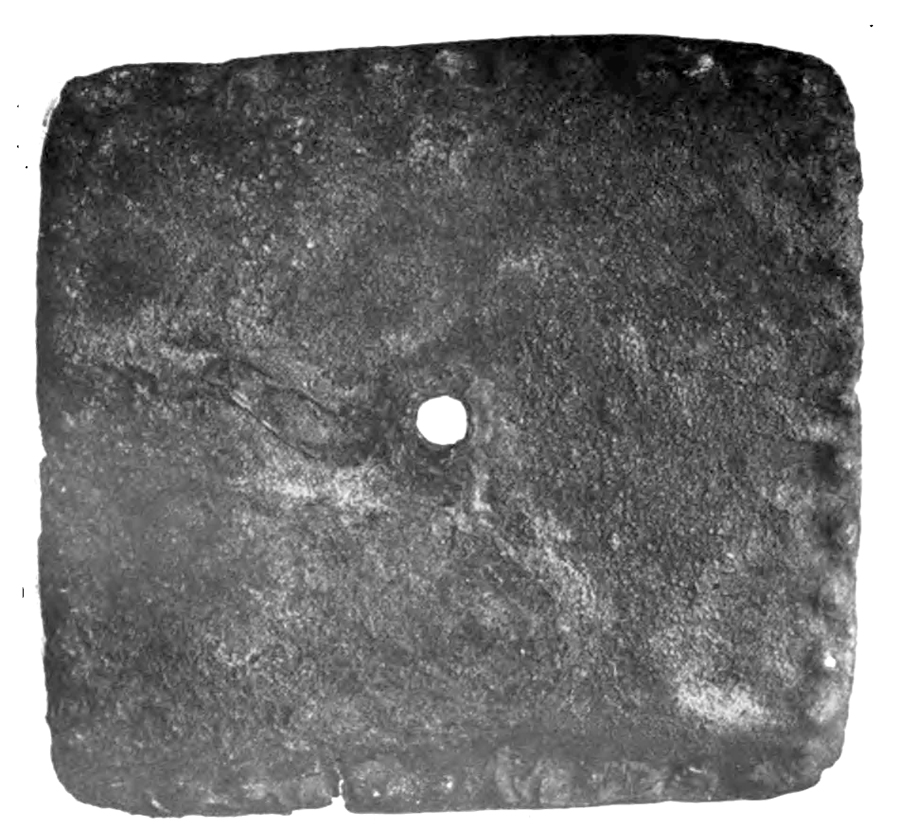
Abstract copper ornament, Bussell Island, Tennessee

== See also ==
- Metallurgy in pre-Columbian America
- Mississippian culture pottery
- Mississippian stone statuary
- Old Copper Complex
- Visual arts by indigenous peoples of the Americas
