= John P. Rogan =

American archaeologist

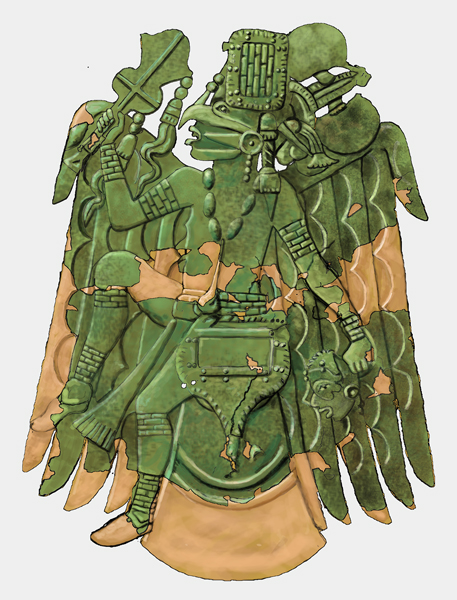
Illustration of a Rogan Plate (Catalogue No. A91117, Department of Anthropology, NMNH, Smithsonian), a Mississippian copper plate of a falcon dancer found at Etowah Indian Mounds, but believed to be fabricated at Cahokia Mounds in the 13th century

John P. Rogan was an archaeologist. Working under Cyrus Thomas in the early 1880s, Rogan conducted the first archaeological excavations on the Etowah Indian Mounds, near Cartersville, Georgia, for the Smithsonian Institution. He discovered a set of copper plates, the Etowah plates, several of which are the famous copper eagle dancer plates, which were later named the Rogan plates (the plates are now Catalogue Nos. A91117 and A91113 in the collections of the Department of Anthropology, National Museum of Natural History, Smithsonian Institution). Rogan tested seven other archaeological sites in Georgia in Bartow, White, Habersham, Forsyth, Rabun, Elbert, and McIntosh counties. He resigned in 1886 to work in the mercantile business in Bristol, Tennessee.
