= History of the United States =

Current territories of the United States after the Trust Territory of the Pacific Islands were given independence in October 1994

The history of the United States spans tens of thousands of years of Indigenous civilization; their descendants include but may not be limited to 575 federally recognized tribes. The history of the present-day United States began in 1607 with the establishment of Jamestown in modern-day Virginia by settlers who arrived from the Kingdom of England, and the landing of the Mayflower by English pilgrims to Plymouth in 1620. In the late 15th century, European colonization began and largely decimated Indigenous societies through genocides, wars, and epidemics. By the 1760s, the Thirteen Colonies, then part of British America and by extension the Kingdom of Great Britain, were established. The Southern Colonies built an agricultural system on slave labor and enslaving millions from Africa. After the British victory over the Kingdom of France in the French and Indian Wars, Parliament imposed a series of taxes and issued the Intolerable Acts on the colonies in 1773, which were designed to end self-governance. Tensions between the colonies and British authorities subsequently intensified, leading to the Revolutionary War, which commenced with the Battles of Lexington and Concord on April 19, 1775. In June 1775, the Second Continental Congress established the Continental Army and unanimously selected George Washington as its commander-in-chief. The following year, on July 2, 1776, the Second Continental Congress voted for the Lee Resolution which created the new nation, and on July 4 formalized its independence by issuing the United States Declaration of Independence. On September 3, 1783, in the Treaty of Paris, the British acknowledged the independence and sovereignty of the Thirteen Colonies, leading to the establishment of the United States. On September 17, 1787, the U.S. Constitution was signed by a majority of delegates, and was later ratified by the Thirteen Colonies, leading to the first modern U.S. government.

In the 1788–89 presidential election, Washington was elected the nation's first president. Along with his Treasury Secretary, Alexander Hamilton, Washington sought to create a relatively stronger central government than that favored by other founders, including Thomas Jefferson and James Madison. On March 4, 1789, the new nation debated, adopted, and ratified the U.S. Constitution, which is now the oldest and longest-standing written and codified national constitution in the world. In 1791, a Bill of Rights was added to guarantee inalienable rights. In 1803, Jefferson, then serving as the nation's third president, negotiated the Louisiana Purchase, which doubled the size of the country. Encouraged by available, inexpensive land, and the notion of manifest destiny, the country underwent westward expansion in a project of settler colonialism marked by a series of conflicts with the continent's indigenous inhabitants. The most notable advocate of manifest destiny was President James K. Polk, who annexed Texas in 1845, and declared war on Mexico the next year. An overwhelming U.S. victory in the Mexican-American War led to the Treaty of Guadalupe Hidalgo in 1848, where the U.S. acquired much of the American Southwest from Mexico. Whether or not slavery should be legal in the expanded territories was an issue of national contention, and led to increasing tensions over slavery.

Following the election of Abraham Lincoln as the nation's 16th president in the 1860 presidential election, southern states seceded and formed the pro-slavery Confederate States of America. In April 1861, at the Battle of Fort Sumter, Confederates launched the Civil War. However, the Union's victory at the Battle of Gettysburg, the deadliest battle in American military history with over 50,000 casualties, proved a turning point in the war, leading to the Union's victory in 1865, which preserved the nation. On April 15, 1865, Lincoln was assassinated. The Confederates' defeat led to the abolition of slavery. In the subsequent Reconstruction era from 1865 to 1877, the national government gained explicit duty to protect individual rights. In 1877, white southern Democrats regained political power in the South, often using paramilitary suppression of voting and Jim Crow laws to maintain white supremacy.

During the Gilded Age from the late 19th century to the early 20th century, the United States emerged as the world's leading industrial power, largely due to entrepreneurship, industrialization, and the arrival of millions of immigrant workers. Dissatisfaction with corruption, inefficiency, and traditional politics stimulated the Progressive movement, leading to reforms, including to the federal income tax, direct election of U.S. Senators, citizenship for many Indigenous people, alcohol prohibition, and women's suffrage. Initially neutral during World War I, the United States declared war on Germany in 1917, joining the successful Allies. After the prosperous Roaring Twenties, the Wall Street crash of 1929 marked the onset of a decade-long global Great Depression.

President Franklin D. Roosevelt launched New Deal programs, including unemployment relief and Social Security. Following the Japanese attack on Pearl Harbor on December 7, 1941, the United States entered World War II, helping defeat the Axis powers; Nazi Germany and Fascist Italy in the European theater and, in the Pacific War, Imperial Japan after using nuclear weapons on Hiroshima and Nagasaki in August 1945. The war led to the US led Allied occupation of Japan until 1952 and the Allied-occupied Germany. Following the end of World War II, the Cold War commenced with the United States and the Soviet Union emerging as superpower rivals; the two countries largely confronted each other indirectly in the arms race, the Space Race, propaganda campaigns, and proxy wars, which included the Korean War and the Vietnam War. In the 1960s, due largely to the civil rights movement, social reforms enforced African Americans' constitutional rights of voting and freedom of movement. In 1991, the United States led a coalition and invaded Iraq during the Gulf War. Later in the year, the Cold War ended with the dissolution of the Soviet Union, leaving the United States as the world's sole superpower.

In the post-Cold War era, the United States has been drawn into conflicts in the Middle East, especially following the September 11 attacks, with the war on terror. In the 21st century, the country was negatively impacted by the Great Recession of 2007 to 2009 and the COVID-19 pandemic of 2020 to 2023. Recently, the U.S. withdrew from the war in Afghanistan, intervened in the Russian invasion of Ukraine, and became militarily involved in the Middle Eastern crisis, and both the 2025 and 2026 strikes in Iran during the Twelve-Day War and 2026 Iran War. The U.S. also refocused on space exploration in the 2020s with its Artemis program, aiming to create a permanent moonbase. Economically, the 21st century has seen increased Wealth inequality, and the rise of Big Tech. Politically, the 21st century has generally been marked by an increase in prevalence of political polarization and populism, and well as democratic backsliding particularly during the administrations of Donald Trump.

== Indigenous period ==
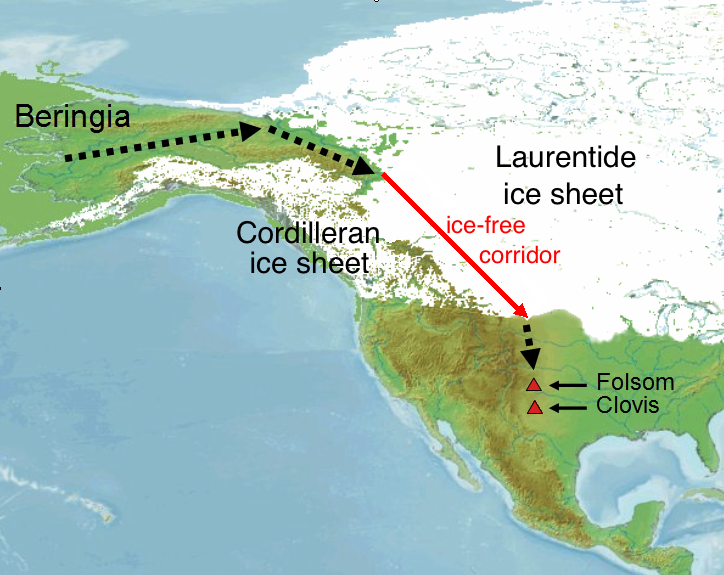
Approximate location of the ice-free corridor and specific Paleoindian sites, according to the Clovis theory

It is not definitively known how or when Native Americans first settled the Americas. The prevailing theory proposes that people from Eurasia followed game across Beringia, a land bridge that connected Siberia to present-day Alaska during the Ice Age, and then spread southward, perhaps as early as 30,000 years ago. These early inhabitants, called Paleo-Indians, soon diversified into hundreds of culturally distinct groups.

=== Paleo-Americans ===
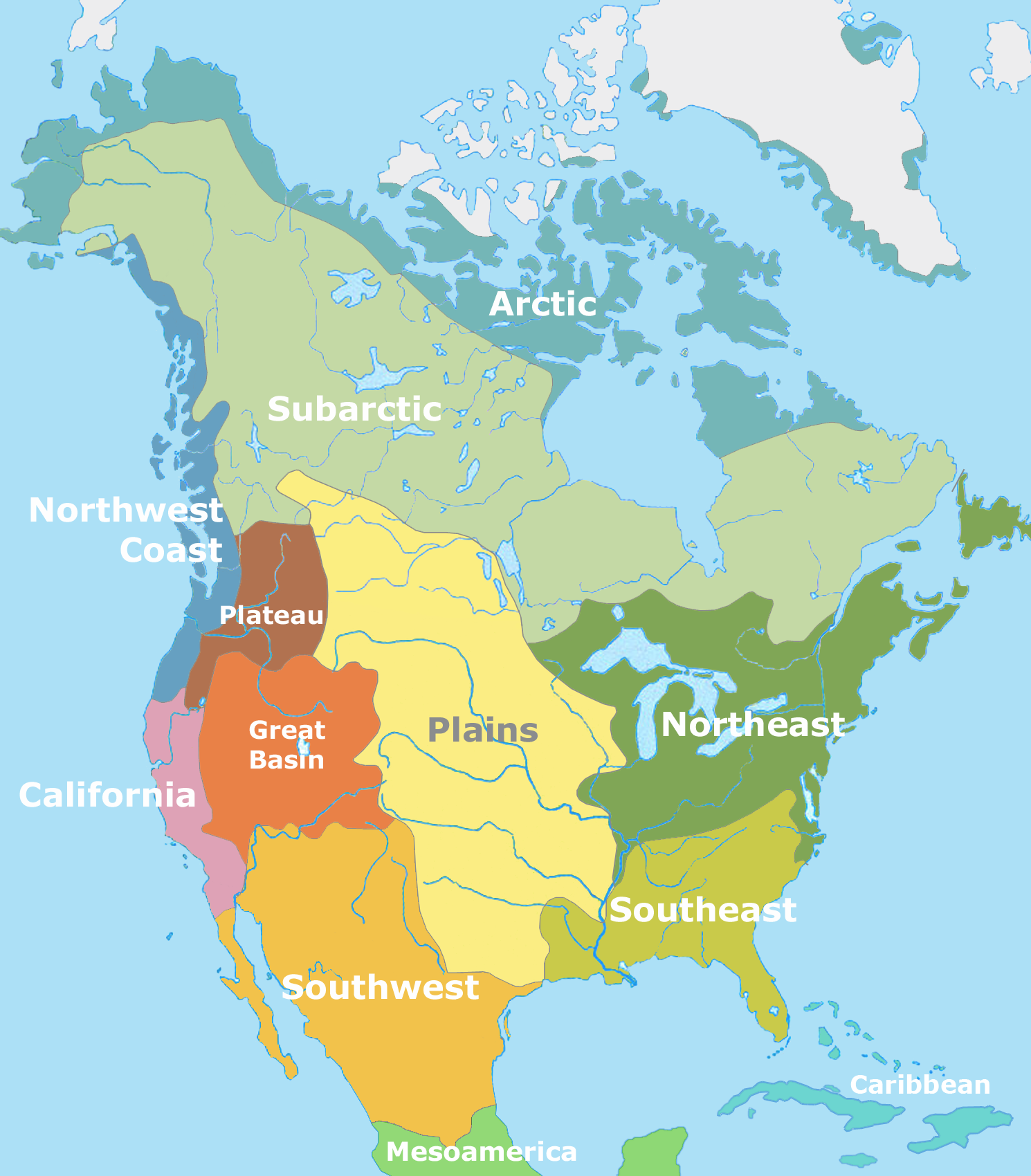
The cultural areas of pre-Columbian North America, according to Alfred Kroeber

By 10,000 BCE, humans had already been well-established throughout North America. Originally, Paleo-Americans hunted Ice Age megafauna like mammoths, but as they began to go extinct, people turned instead to bison as a food source, and later foraging for berries and seeds. Paleo-Americans in central Mexico were the first in the Americas to farm, around 8,000 BCE. Eventually, the knowledge began to spread northward. By 3,000 BCE, corn was being grown in the valleys of Arizona and New Mexico, followed by primitive irrigation systems and, by 300 BCE, early villages of the Hohokam.

One of the earlier cultures in the present-day United States was the Clovis culture (9,100 to 8,850 BCE), who are primarily identified by the use of fluted spear points called the Clovis point. The Folsom culture was similar, but is marked by the use of the Folsom point.

A later migration around 8,000 BCE included Na-Dene-speaking peoples, who reached the Pacific Northwest by 5,000 BCE. From there, they migrated along the Pacific Coast and into the interior. Another group, the Oshara tradition people, who lived from 5,500 BCE to 600 CE, were part of the Archaic Southwest.

=== Mound builders and pueblos ===
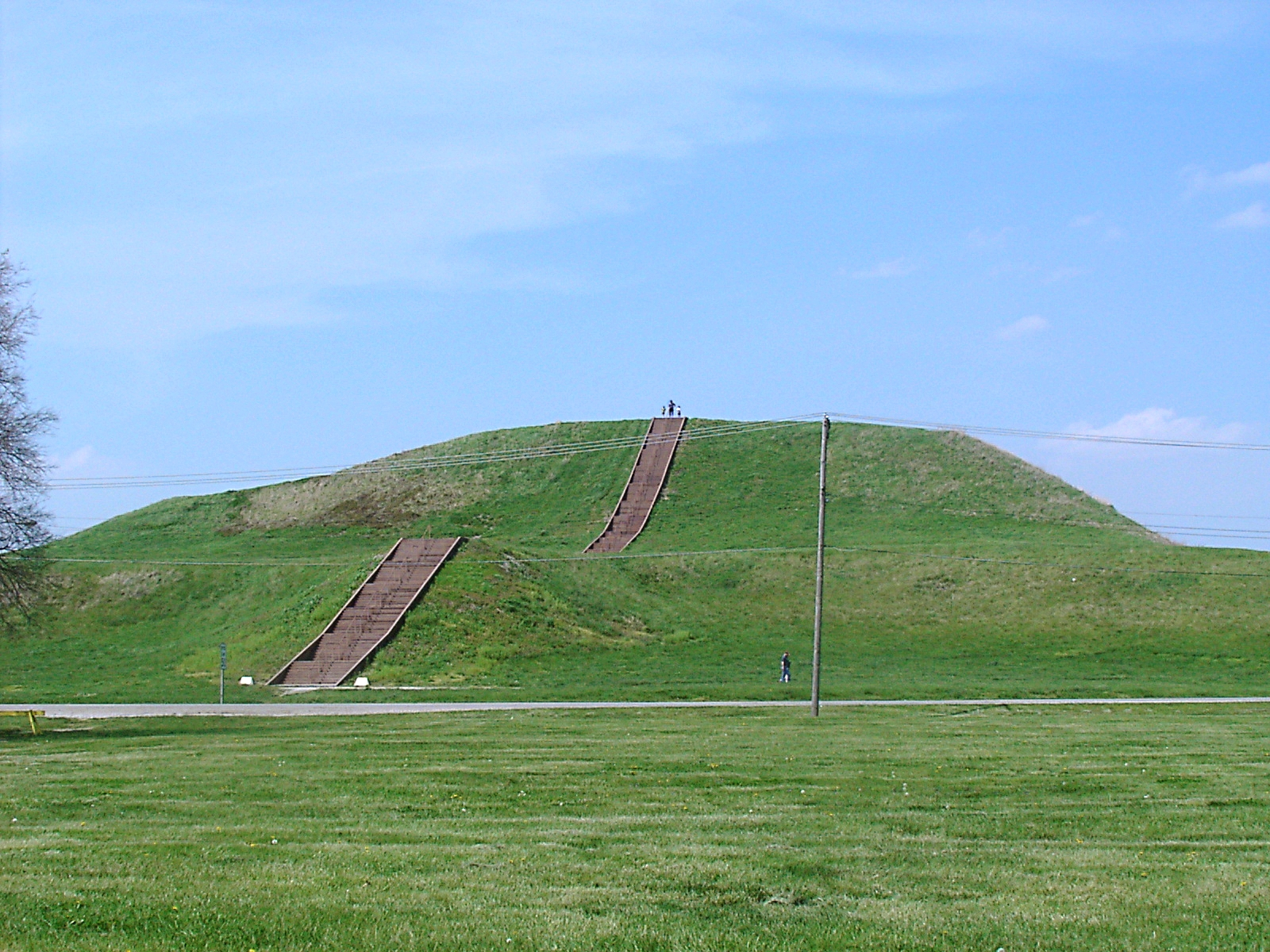
Monks Mound of Cahokia, a UNESCO World Heritage Site, in summer

The Adena began constructing large earthwork mounds around 600 BCE. They are the earliest known people to have been Mound Builders, although there are mounds in the United States that predate this culture. The Adenans were absorbed into the Hopewell tradition, a powerful people who traded tools and goods across a wide territory. They continued the Adena tradition of mound-building and pioneered a trading system called the Hopewell Exchange System, which at its greatest extent ran from the present-day Southeast up to the Canadian side of Lake Ontario. By 500 CE, the Hopewellians had been absorbed into the larger Mississippian culture.

The Mississippians were a broad group of tribes. Their most important city was Cahokia, near modern-day St. Louis, Missouri. At its peak in the 12th century, the city had an estimated population of 20,000, larger than the population of London at the time. The entire city was centered around the Monks Mound that stood 100 feet (30 m) tall. Cahokia, like many other cities and villages of the time, depended on hunting, foraging, trading, and agriculture, and developed a class system with slaves and human sacrifice that was influenced by societies to the south, like the Mayans.

In the Southwest, the Anasazi began constructing stone and adobe pueblos around 900 BCE. These apartment-like structures were often built into cliff faces, as seen in the Cliff Palace at Mesa Verde. Some grew to be the size of cities, with Pueblo Bonito along the Chaco River in New Mexico once consisting of 800 rooms.

=== Northwest and northeast ===
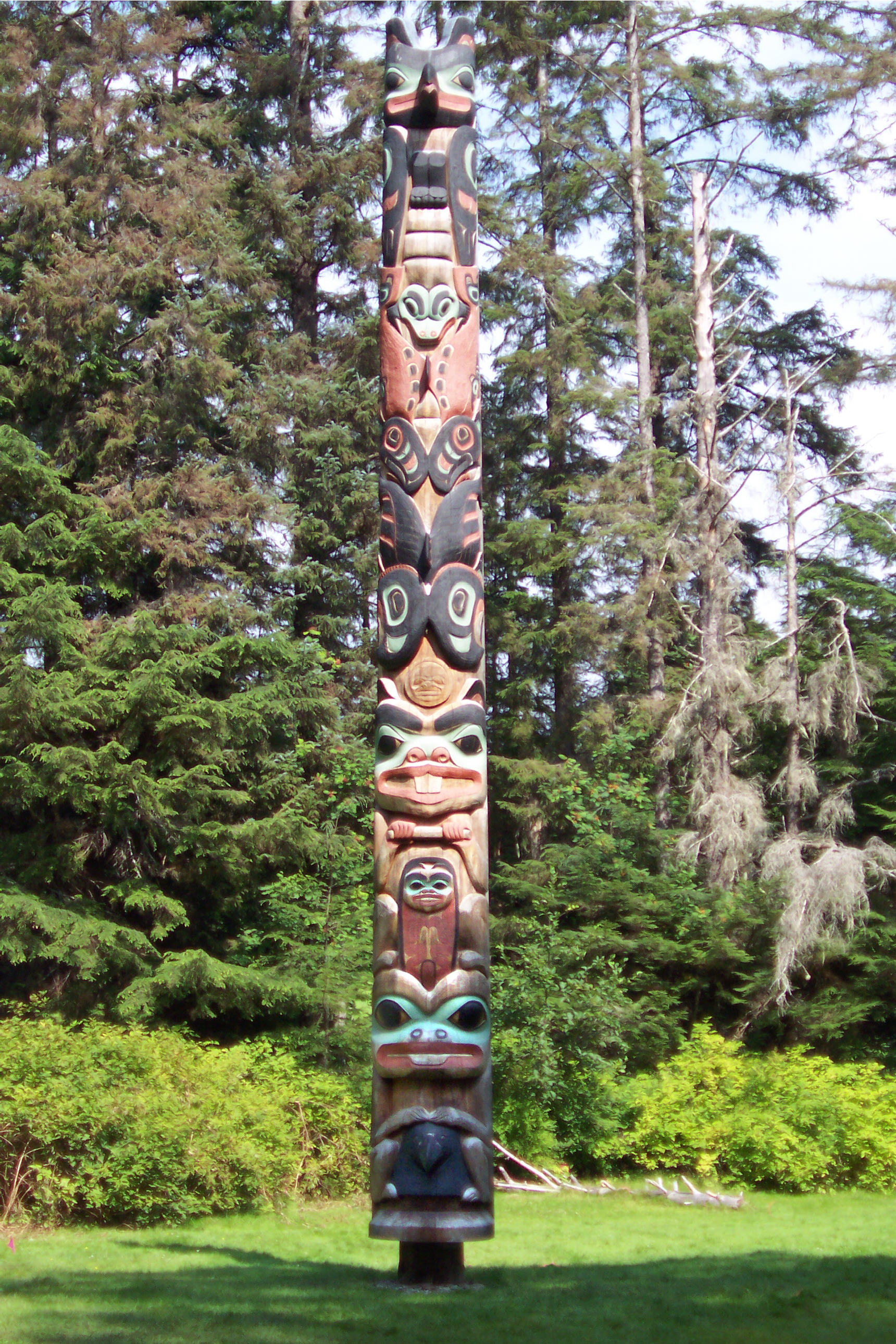
The K'alyaan Totem pole of the Tlingit Kiks.ádi Clan, erected at Sitka National Historical Park to commemorate the lives lost in the Battle of Sitka in 1804

The Indigenous peoples of the Pacific Northwest were likely the most affluent Native Americans. Many distinct cultural groups and political entities developed there, but they all shared certain beliefs, traditions, and practices, such as the centrality of salmon as a resource and spiritual symbol. Permanent villages began to develop in this region as early as 1,000 BCE, and these communities celebrated by the gift-giving feast of the potlatch.

In present-day upstate New York, the Haudenosaunee (Iroquois) formed a confederacy of tribal nations in the mid-15th century, consisting of the Mohawk, Oneida, Onondaga, Cayuga, and Seneca. Each nation was represented at a Grand Council of 50 chiefs who were condoled by the Haudenosaunee Clan Mothers. It has been suggested that their confederal structure under the Great Law of Peace contributed to political thinking during the development of the United States government. The Haudenosaunee were powerful, waging war with many neighboring tribes, and later, Europeans. As their territory expanded, smaller tribes were forced further west, including the Osage, Kaw, Ponca, and Omaha peoples.

=== Native Hawaiians ===
The exact date for the settling of Hawaii is disputed but the first settlement most likely took place between 940 and 1130 CE. Around 1200 CE, Tahitian explorers found and began settling the area. This marked the rise of the Hawaiian civilization, which would be largely separated from the rest of the world until the arrival of the British 600 years later. Europeans under the British explorer James Cook arrived in the Hawaiian Islands in 1778, and within five years of contact, European military technology would help Kamehameha I conquer most of the island group, and eventually unify the islands for the first time, establishing the Hawaiian Kingdom.

=== Puerto Rico ===
The island of Puerto Rico has been settled for at least 4,000 years. Starting with the Ortoiroid culture, successive generations of native migrations arrived replacing or absorbing local populations. By the year 1000 Arawak people had arrived from South America via the Lesser Antilles; these settlers would become the Taíno encountered by the Spanish in 1493. Upon European contact a native population between 30,000 and 60,000 was likely, led by a single chief called a Cacique. Colonization resulted in the decimation of the local inhabitants due to the harsh Encomienda system and epidemics caused by Old World diseases. Puerto Rico would remain a part of Spain until American annexation in 1898.

== European colonization (1075–1754) ==
=== Norse exploration ===
The earliest recorded European mention of America is in a treatise by the medieval chronicler Adam of Bremen, circa 1075, where it is referred to as Vinland. (Note: 'In addition, he [i.e., Sweyn Estridsson, king of Denmark (reigned 1047–1076)] named one more island in this ocean, discovered by many, which is called "Vinland", because vines grow wild there, making the best wine. For [that] crops [that are] not sown, abound there, we learn not from fanciful opinion but from the true account of the Danes.') It is also extensively referred to in the Norse Vinland sagas. The strongest archaeological evidence of the existence of Norse settlements in America is located in Canada; there is significant scholarly debate as to whether Norse explorers also made landfall in New England.

=== Early settlements ===
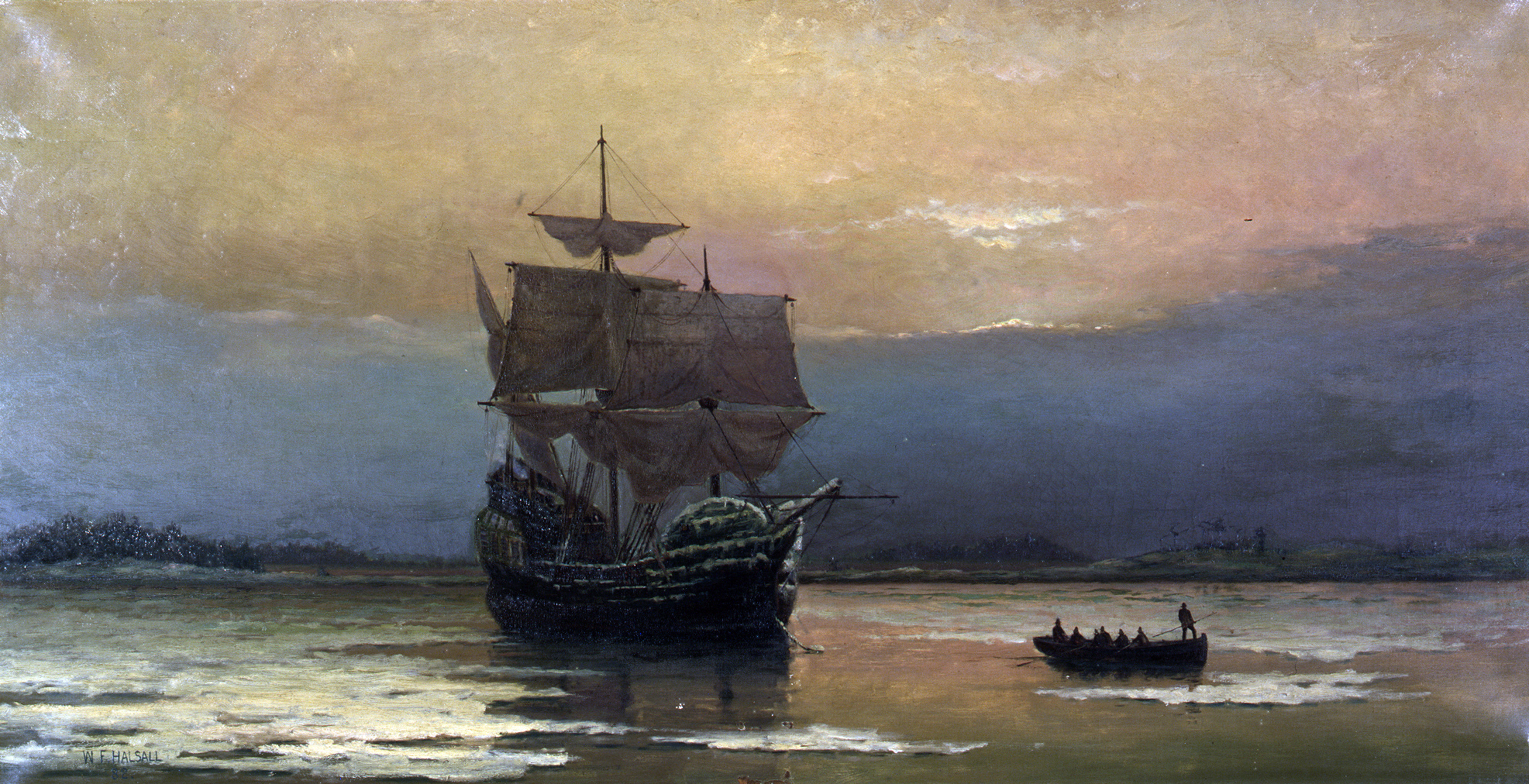
The Mayflower in Plymouth Harbor. Fluyts, caravels, and carracks brought Europeans to the Americas.

Europeans brought horses, cattle, and hogs to the Americas and took back maize, turkeys, tomatoes, potatoes, tobacco, beans, and squash to Europe. Many explorers and early settlers died after being exposed to new diseases in the Americas. However, the effects of new Eurasian diseases carried by the colonists, especially smallpox and measles, were much worse for the Native Americans, as they had no immunity to them. They suffered epidemics and died in very large numbers, usually before large-scale European settlement began. Their societies were disrupted by the scale of deaths.

==== Spanish contact ====
Spanish explorers were the first Europeans, after the Norse, to reach the present-day United States, after the voyages of Christopher Columbus (beginning in 1492) established possessions in the Caribbean, including the modern-day U.S. territories of Puerto Rico, and parts of the U.S. Virgin Islands. Juan Ponce de León landed in Florida in 1513. Spanish expeditions quickly reached the Appalachian Mountains, the Mississippi River, the Grand Canyon, and the Great Plains.

In 1539, Hernando de Soto extensively explored the Southeast, and a year later Francisco Coronado explored from Arizona to central Kansas in search of gold. Escaped horses from Coronado's party spread over the Great Plains, and the Plains Indians mastered horsemanship within a few generations. Small Spanish settlements eventually grew to become important cities, such as San Antonio, Albuquerque, Tucson, Los Angeles, and San Francisco.

==== Dutch mid-Atlantic ====
The Dutch East India Company sent explorer Henry Hudson to search for a Northwest Passage to Asia in 1609. New Netherland was established in 1621 by the company to capitalize on the North American fur trade. Growth was slow at first due to mismanagement by the Dutch and Native American conflicts. After the Dutch purchased the island of Manhattan from the Native Americans, the land was named New Amsterdam and became the capital of New Netherland. The town rapidly expanded and in the mid-1600s it became an important trading center. Despite being Calvinists and building the Reformed Church in America, the Dutch were tolerant of other religions and cultures and traded with the Haudenosaunee to the north.

The colony served as a barrier to British expansion from New England, and as a result a series of wars were fought. The colony was taken over by Britain as New York in 1664 and its capital was renamed New York City.

==== Swedish settlement ====
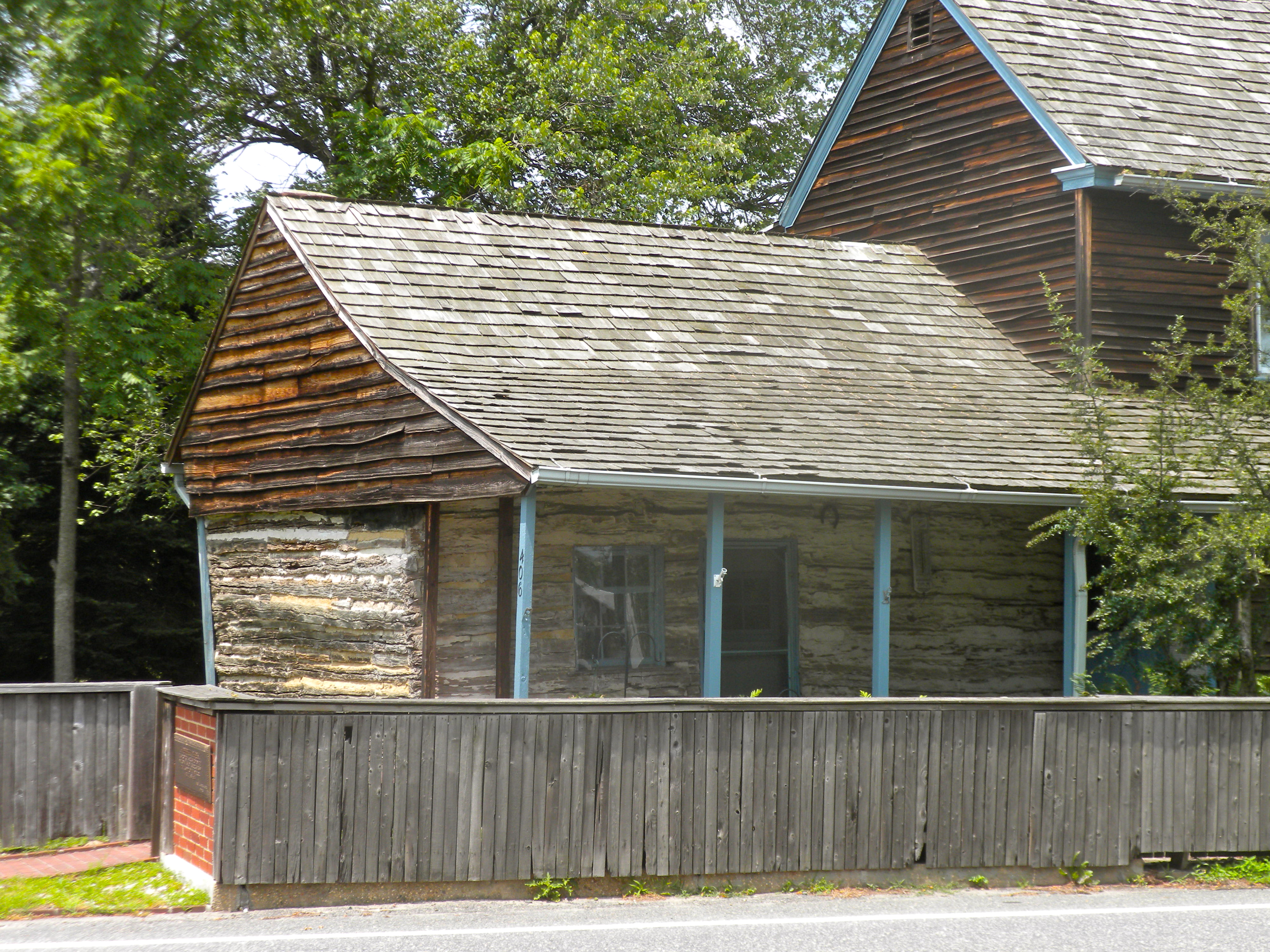
C. A. Nothnagle Log House in Gibbstown, New Jersey, the oldest wooden building in the United States

In the early years of the Swedish Empire, Swedish, Dutch, and German stockholders formed the New Sweden Company to trade furs and tobacco in North America. The company's first expedition was led by Peter Minuit, who had been governor of New Netherland from 1626 to 1631, and landed in Delaware Bay in March 1638. The settlers founded Fort Christina at the site of modern-day Wilmington, Delaware, and made treaties with Indigenous peoples for land ownership on both sides of the Delaware River.

Over the following seventeen years, 12 more expeditions brought settlers from the Swedish Empire to New Sweden. The colony established 19 permanent settlements along with many farms, extending into modern-day Maryland, Pennsylvania, and New Jersey. It was incorporated into New Netherland in 1655 after a Dutch invasion from the neighboring New Netherland colony during the Second Northern War.

==== French ====
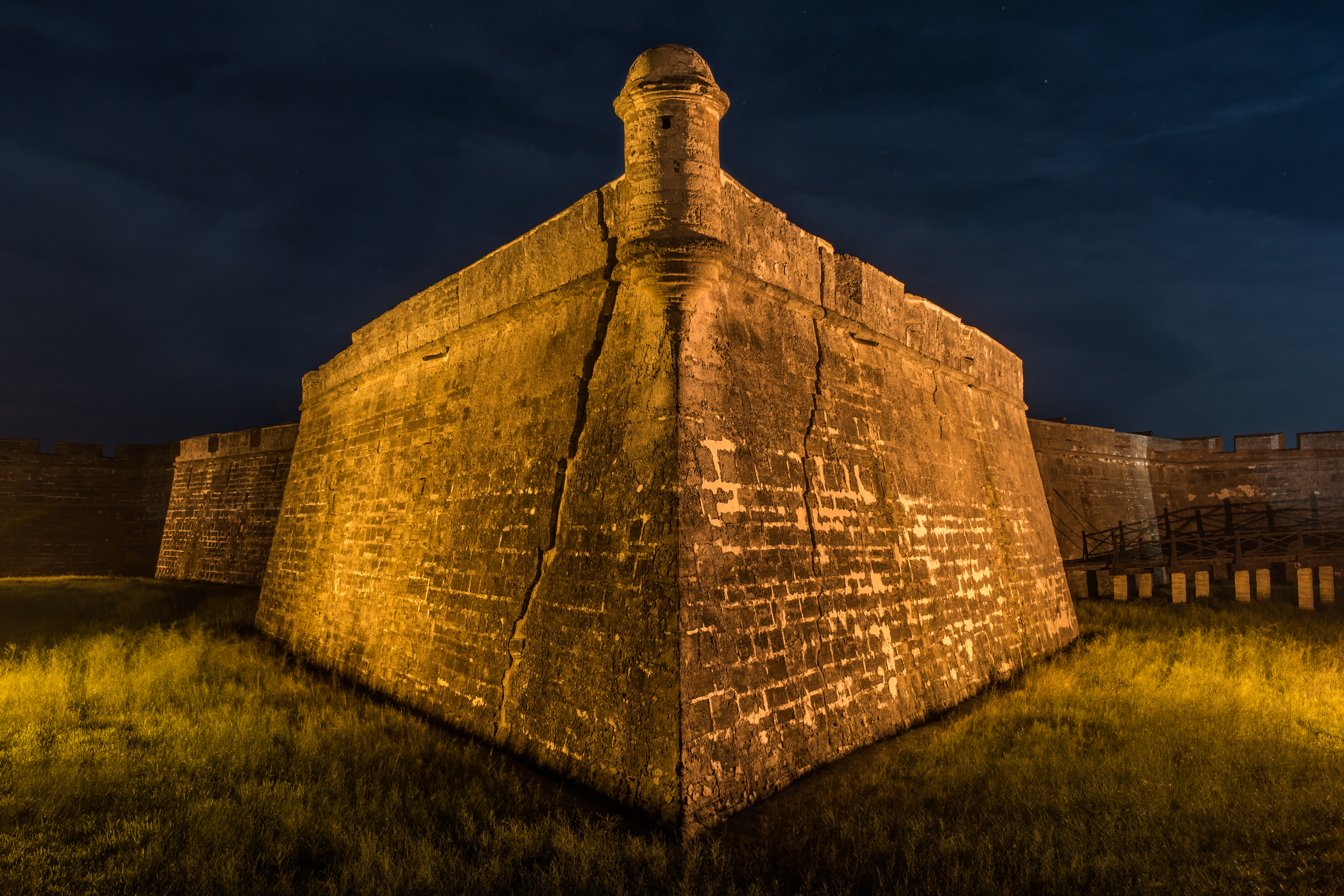
The San Pablo Bastion of the Castillo de San Marcos, completed in 1683, in St. Augustine, Florida

Giovanni da Verrazzano landed in North Carolina in 1524, and was the first European to sail into New York Harbor and Narragansett Bay. In the 1540s, French Huguenots settled at Fort Caroline near present-day Jacksonville, Florida. In 1565, Spanish forces led by Pedro Menéndez destroyed the settlement and established the first Spanish settlement in what would become the United States — St. Augustine.

Most French lived in Quebec and Acadia (modern Canada), but far-reaching trade relationships with Native Americans spread their influence. French colonists in small villages along the Mississippi and Illinois rivers lived in farming communities that served as a grain source for Gulf Coast settlements. The French established plantations in Louisiana along with settling New Orleans, Mobile, and Biloxi.

=== British colonies ===
The first attempt from England to colonize the North America was the colony of Roanoke, in 1587. This journey was under Queen Elizabeth I, they came to an area of what is know the Outer Banks. John White sponsored the journey, how even after a couple years he took a voyage back to England. A war prevented his return, when he got back the only sign that there was anyone ever living there was the letters CRO, which are presumed to mean the Croatoan tribe that was near by.

The English, drawn in by Francis Drake's raids on Spanish treasure ships leaving the New World, settled the strip of land along the east coast in the 1600s. The early British colonies were established by private groups seeking profit, and were marked by starvation, disease, and Native American attacks. Many immigrants were people seeking religious freedom or escaping political oppression, peasants displaced by the Industrial Revolution, or those simply seeking adventure and opportunity. Between the late 1610s and the Revolution, the British shipped an estimated 50,000 to 120,000 convicts to their American colonies.

In some areas, Native Americans taught colonists how to grow local crops. In others, they attacked the settlers. Virgin forests provided an ample supply of building material and firewood. Natural inlets and harbors lined the coast, providing easy ports for essential trade with Europe. Settlements remained close to the coast due to this as well as Native American resistance and the Appalachian Mountains in the interior.

==== First settlement in Jamestown ====
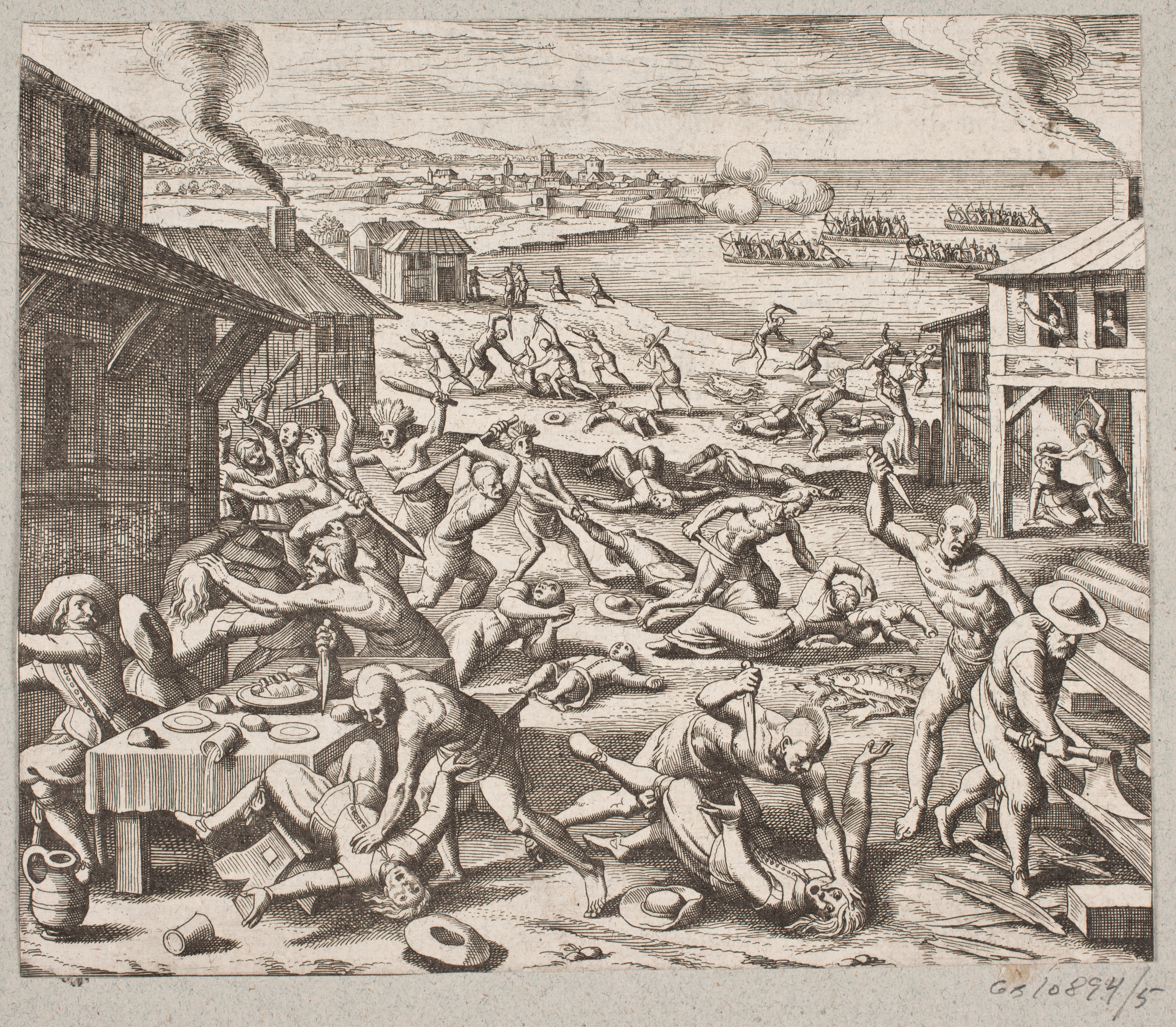
Following the Indian massacre of Jamestown settlers in 1622, colonists in Virginia feared all natives as enemies.

The first successful English colony, Jamestown, was established by the Virginia Company in 1607 on the James River in Virginia. The colonists were preoccupied with the search for gold and were ill-equipped for life in the New World. Captain John Smith held the fledgling Jamestown together in the first year, and the colony descended into anarchy and nearly failed when he returned to England two years later. John Rolfe began experimenting with tobacco from the West Indies in 1612, and by 1614 the first shipment arrived in London. It became Virginia's chief source of revenue within a decade.

In 1624, after years of disease and Indian attacks, including the Powhatan attack of 1622, King James I revoked the Virginia Company's charter and made Virginia a royal colony.

==== New England Colonies ====
New England was initially settled primarily by Puritans fleeing religious persecution. The Pilgrims sailed for Virginia on the Mayflower in 1620, but were knocked off course by a storm and landed at Plymouth, where they agreed to a social contract of rules in the Mayflower Compact. About half died in the first winter. Like Jamestown, Plymouth suffered from disease and starvation, but local Wampanoag Indians taught the colonists how to farm maize.

Plymouth was followed by the Puritans and Massachusetts Bay Colony in 1630. They maintained a charter for self-government separate from England, and elected founder John Winthrop as governor. Roger Williams opposed Winthrop's treatment of Native Americans and religious intolerance, and established the colony of Providence Plantations, later Rhode Island, on the basis of freedom of religion. Other colonists established settlements in the Connecticut River Valley, and on the coasts of present-day New Hampshire and Maine. Native American attacks continued, with the most significant occurring in the 1637 Pequot War and the 1675 King Philip's War.

New England became a center of commerce and industry due to the poor, mountainous soil making agriculture difficult. Rivers were harnessed to power grain mills and sawmills, and the numerous harbors facilitated trade. Tight-knit villages developed around these industrial centers, and Boston became one of America's most important ports.

==== Middle Colonies ====
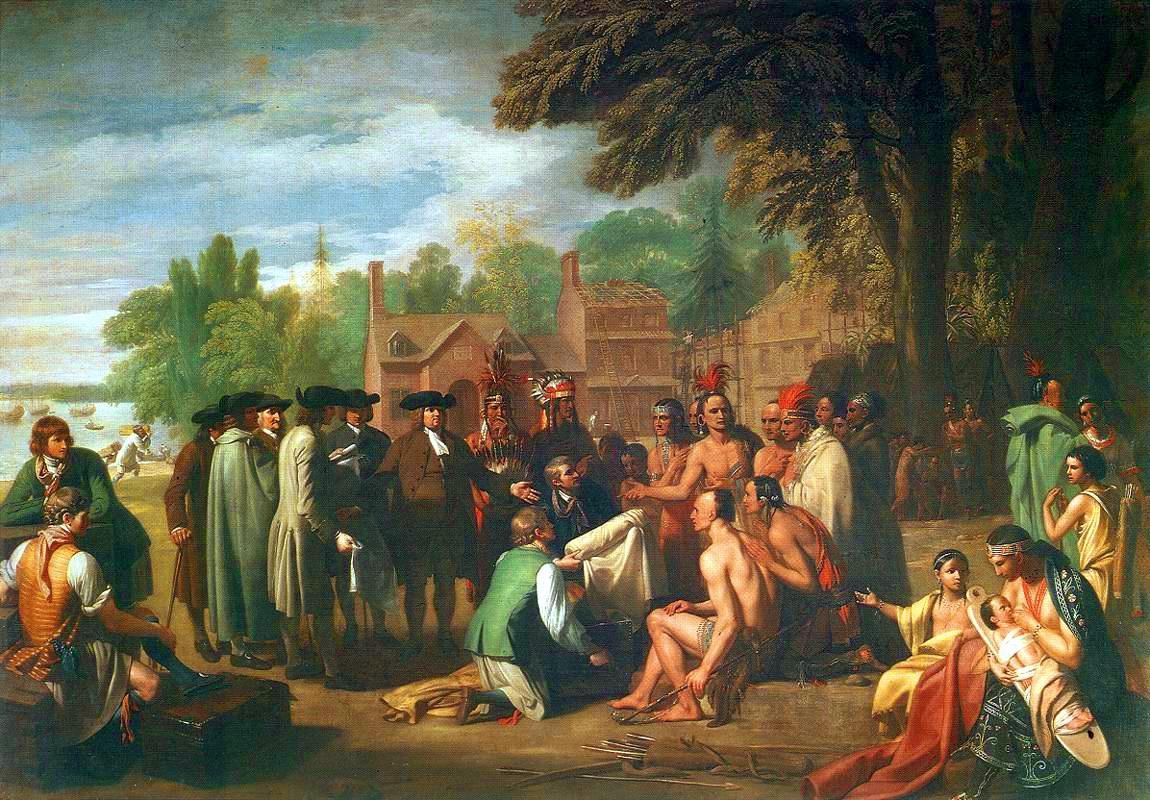
Treaty of Penn with the Indians, a portrait depicting William Penn signing the Treaty of Shackamaxon with Lenape Indians in the Province of Pennsylvania in 1682 by Benjamin West

In the 1660s, the Middle Colonies of New York, New Jersey, and Delaware were established in the former Dutch New Netherland, and were characterized by a large degree of ethnic and religious diversity. At the same time, the Haudenosaunee of New York, strengthened by years of fur trading with Europeans, formed the powerful Haudenosaunee Confederacy.

The last colony in this region was Pennsylvania, established in 1681 by William Penn as a home for religious dissenters, including Quakers, Methodists, and the Amish. The capital of the colony, Philadelphia, became a dominant commercial center in a few short years. While Quakers populated the city, German immigrants began to flood into the Pennsylvanian hills and forests, while the Scots-Irish pushed into the far western frontier.

==== Southern Colonies ====
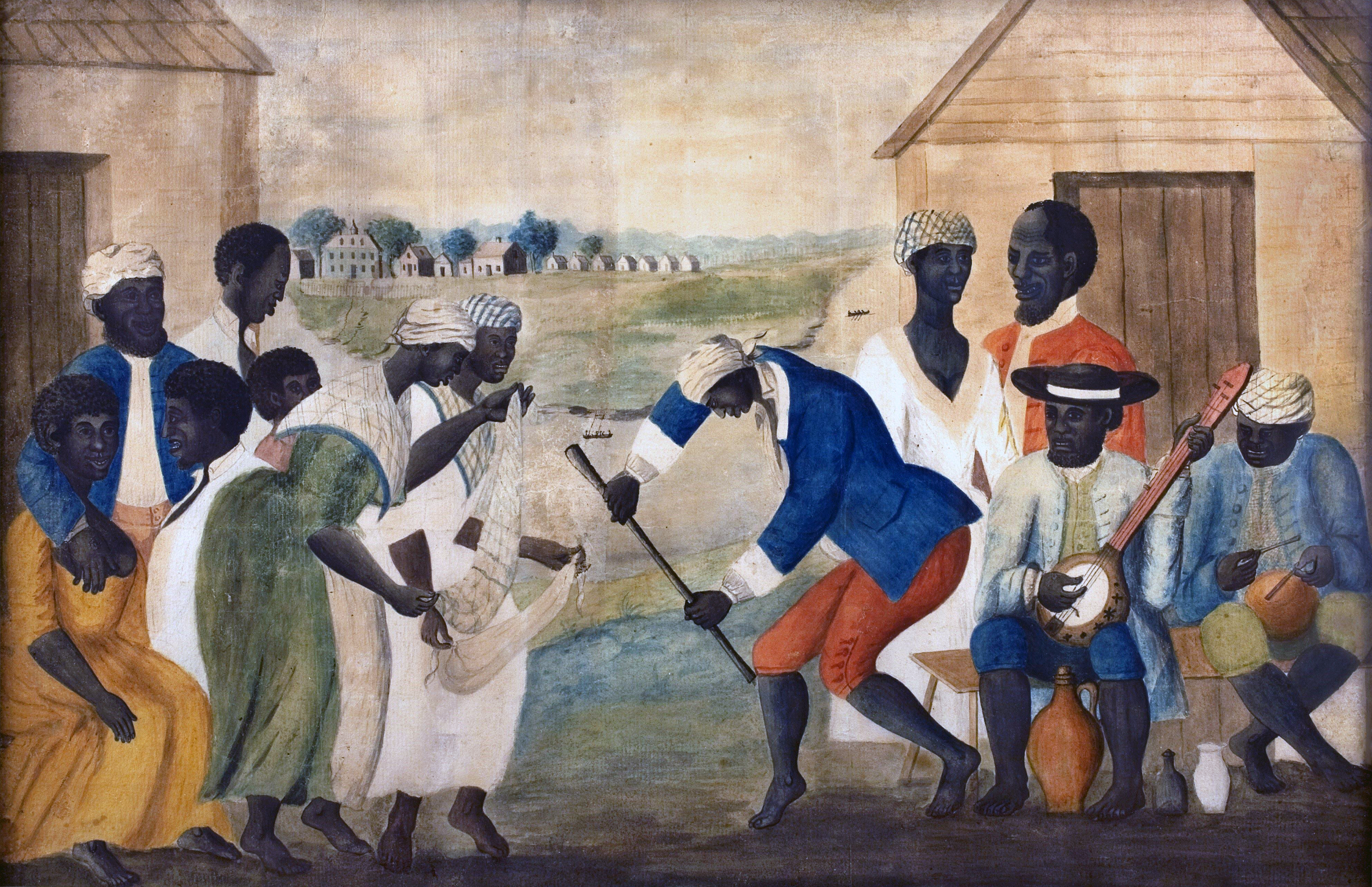
The Old Plantation, a late-18th century painting depicting enslaved people dancing at a plantation in South Carolina.

The overwhelmingly rural Southern Colonies contrasted sharply with the New England and Middle Colonies. After Virginia, the second British colony south of New England was Maryland, established as a Catholic haven in 1632. The economy of these two colonies was built entirely on yeoman farmers and planters. The planters established themselves in the Tidewater region of Virginia, establishing massive plantations with slave labor.

In 1670, the Province of Carolina was established, and Charleston became the region's great trading port. While Virginia's economy was also based on tobacco, Carolina was more diversified, exporting rice, indigo, and lumber as well. In 1712, it was divided in two, creating North and South Carolina. The Georgia Colony was established by James Oglethorpe in 1732 as a border to Spanish Florida and a reform colony for former prisoners and the poor.

==== Religion ====
Religiosity expanded greatly after the First Great Awakening, a religious revival in the 1740s led by preachers such as Jonathan Edwards and George Whitefield. American Evangelicals affected by the Awakening added a new emphasis on divine outpourings of the Holy Spirit and conversions that implanted new believers with an intense love for God. Revivals encapsulated those hallmarks and carried the newly created evangelicalism into the early republic, setting the stage for the Second Great Awakening in the late 1790s. In the early stages, evangelicals in the South, such as Methodists and Baptists, preached for religious freedom and abolition of slavery.

==== Government ====
Each of the American colonies had a slightly different governmental structure. Typically, a colony was ruled by a governor appointed from London who controlled the executive administration and relied upon a locally elected legislature to vote on taxes and make laws. By the 18th century, the American colonies were growing very rapidly as a result of low death rates along with ample supplies of land and food. The colonies were richer than most parts of Britain, and attracted a steady flow of immigrants, especially teenagers who arrived as indentured servants.

==== Servitude and slavery ====
A map of the British, French and Spanish settlements in North America in 1750, before the French and Indian War

Over half of all European immigrants to Colonial America arrived as indentured servants. Typically, people would sign a contract agreeing to a set term of labor, usually four to seven years, and in return would receive transport to America and a piece of land at the end of their servitude. In some cases, ships' captains received rewards for the delivery of poor migrants, and so extravagant promises and kidnapping were common.

The first African slaves arrived in 1619. Initially regarded as indentured servants who could buy their freedom, the institution of slavery began to harden and the involuntary servitude became lifelong as the demand for labor on tobacco and rice plantations grew in the 1660s. Slavery became identified with brown skin color, and the children of slave women were born slaves, known as partus sequitur ventrem. By the 1770s, African slaves comprised a fifth of the American population.

The question of independence from Britain did not arise as long as the colonies needed British military support against the French and Spanish powers. Those threats were gone by 1765. However, London continued to regard the American colonies as existing for the benefit of the mother country in a policy known as mercantilism.

Colonial America was defined by a severe labor shortage that used forms of unfree labor, such as slavery and indentured servitude. The British colonies were also marked by a policy of avoiding strict enforcement of parliamentary laws, known as salutary neglect. This permitted the development of an American spirit distinct from that of its European founders.

== Revolutionary period (1754–1793) ==
=== Lead-up to the Revolution ===
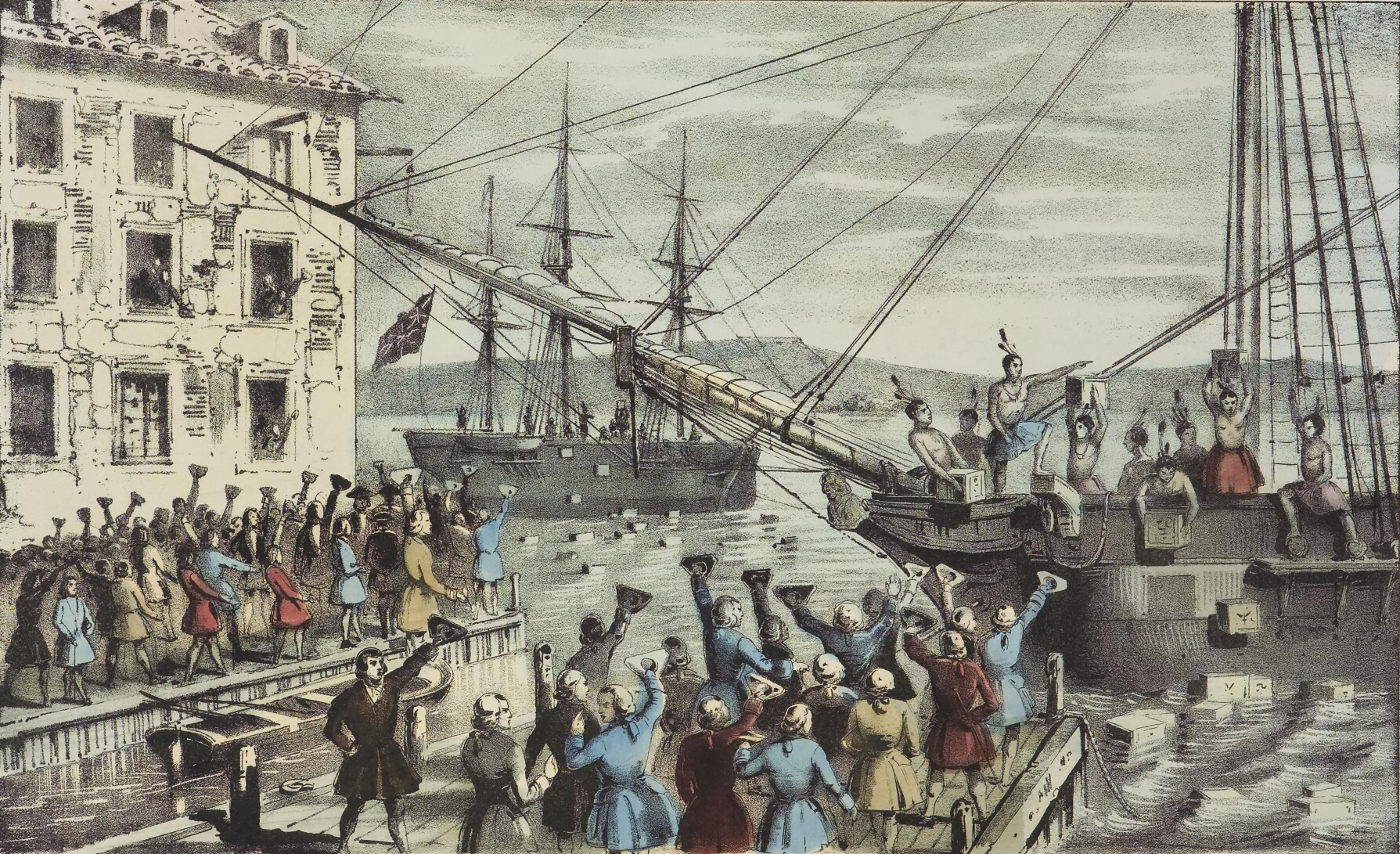
A portrait depicting the Boston Tea Party on December 16, 1773, a prominent act of rebellion that served to dramatically escalate the American Revolution, leading ultimately to the commencement of the American Revolutionary War at the Battles of Lexington and Concord on April 19, 1775

The French and Indian War (1754–1763), part of the larger Seven Years' War, was a watershed event in the political development of the colonies. The influence of the French and Native Americans, the main rivals of the British Crown in the colonies and Canada, was significantly reduced and the territory of the Thirteen Colonies expanded into New France in Canada and Louisiana. The war effort also resulted in greater political integration of the colonies, as reflected in the Albany Congress and symbolized by Benjamin Franklin's call for the colonies to "Join, or Die."

King George III issued the Royal Proclamation of 1763, to organize the new North American empire and protect the Native Americans from colonial expansion west of the Appalachian Mountains. Strains developed in the relations between the colonists and the Crown. The British Parliament passed the Stamp Act of 1765, imposing a tax on the colonies without going through the colonial legislatures. Crying "No taxation without representation", the colonists refused to pay. On March 5, 1770, in an event that would fuel anti-British sentiment throughout the colonies, a violent confrontation between a local mob and British troops in Boston led to the deaths of five Bostonians in what became known as the Boston Massacre.

On December 16, 1773, the Boston Tea Party was a direct action to protest the new tax on tea. Parliament responded the next year with the Intolerable Acts, stripping Massachusetts of its historic right of self-government and putting it under military rule, which sparked outrage and resistance in all thirteen colonies. Patriot leaders from every colony convened the First Continental Congress to coordinate their resistance. The Congress called for a boycott of British trade, published a list of rights and grievances, and petitioned the king to rectify those grievances. This appeal had no effect.

=== American Revolution ===
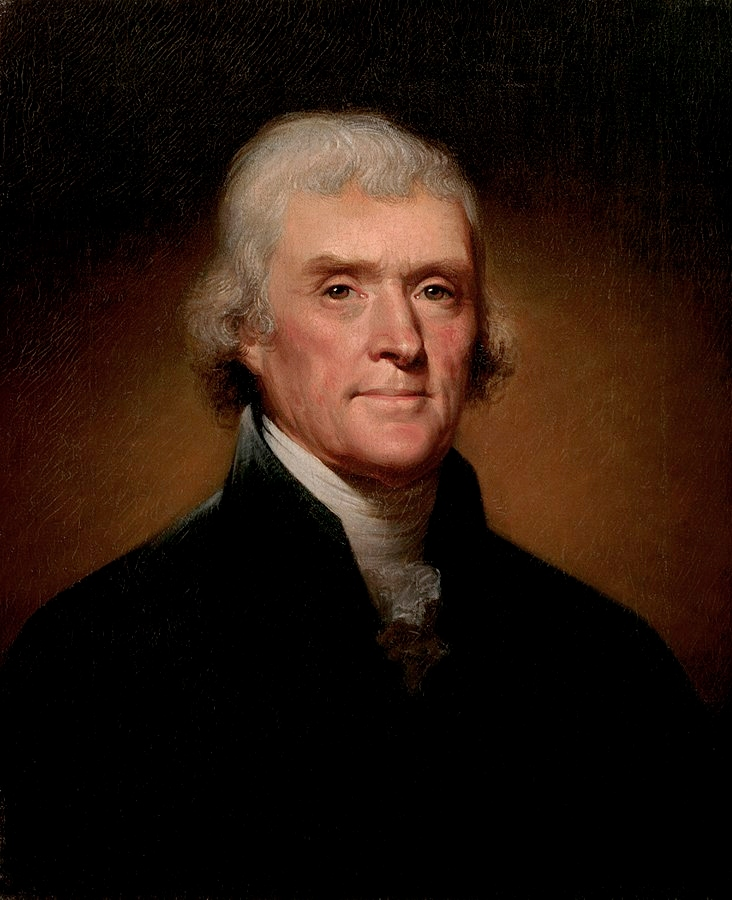
Thomas Jefferson, the principal author of the Declaration of Independence and a principle intellectual force behind the American Revolution, wrote the first draft of the Declaration in isolation over a period of two weeks between June 11, 1776, and June 28, 1776, from the second floor of a three-story home he was renting at 700 Market Street in Philadelphia. The Declaration was unanimously adopted by the Second Continental Congress a week later, on July 4, 1776, at present-day Independence Hall

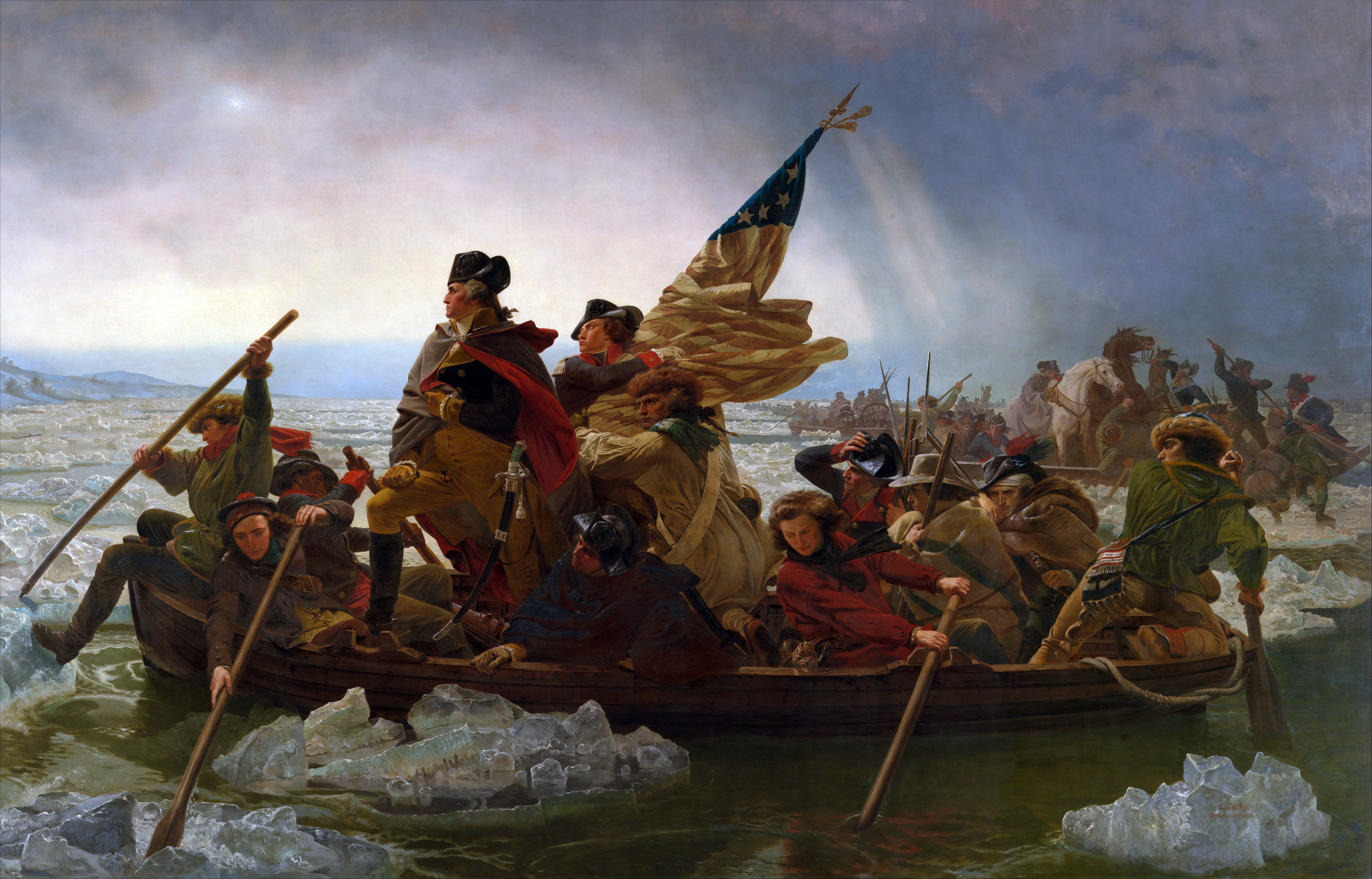
Washington's covert crossing of the Delaware River over the night of December 25–26, 1776, represented a major comeback for the cause of American independence following the loss of New York City, allowing Washington and the Continental Army to launch surprise attacks on British and Hessian troops in Trenton and Princeton and recapture New Jersey.

The Second Continental Congress voted to declare independence on July 2, 1776. The Declaration of Independence presented arguments in favor of the rights of citizens, stating that all men are created equal, supporting the rights of Life, Liberty and the pursuit of Happiness, and demanding the consent of the governed. The Founding Fathers were guided by the ideology of republicanism, rejecting the monarchism then dominant in Europe. The Declaration of Independence was signed by members of the Congress on July 4. This date has since been commemorated as Independence Day.

The American Revolutionary War began with the Battles of Lexington and Concord on April 19, 1775. George Washington was appointed general of the Continental Army. Washington's crossing of the Delaware River began a series of victories that expelled British forces from New Jersey. The British began the Saratoga campaign in 1777 to capture Albany, New York, as a choke point. After the American victory at Saratoga, France, the Netherlands, and Spain began providing support to the Continental Army. Britain responded to defeat in the northern theater by advancing in the southern theater, beginning with the capture of Savannah in 1778. American forces reclaimed the south in 1781, and a British army was captured at the siege of Yorktown on October 19, 1781.

King George III formally ordered the end of hostilities on December 5, 1782, recognizing American independence. The Treaty of Paris was signed on September 3, 1783, and was ratified by the Congress of the Confederation on January 14, 1784.

=== Confederation period ===
The Articles of Confederation were ratified as the governing law of the United States, written to limit the powers of the central government in favor of states. This caused economic decline, as the government was unable to pass economic legislation, levy taxes, and pay its debts. Nationalists worried that the confederate nature of the union was too fragile to withstand an armed conflict with any adversarial states, or even internal revolts such as Shays' Rebellion of 1786 in Massachusetts.

In the 1780s the western regions were ceded by the states to Congress and became territories. With the migration of settlers to the Northwest, soon they became states. The American Indian Wars continued in the 1780s as settlers moved west. The Northwestern Confederacy and American settlers began fighting the Northwest Indian War in the late 1780s; the Northwestern Confederacy received British support, but the settlers received little assistance from the American government.

Nationalists – most of them war veterans – organized in every state and convinced Congress to call the Philadelphia Convention in 1787. The delegates from every state wrote a new Constitution that created a federal government with a strong president and powers of taxation. The new government reflected the prevailing republican ideals of guarantees of individual liberty and of constraining the power of government through separation of powers. The constitution was ratified by a sufficient number of states in 1788 to begin forming a federal government.

== Early republic (1793–1830) ==
The United States Electoral College chose George Washington as the first President in 1789. The national capital moved from New York to Philadelphia in 1790 and finally, in 1800, to Washington, D.C.

The major accomplishment of the Washington Administration was the creation of a strong national government that was recognized by all Americans. Washington's government, following the vigorous leadership of Treasury Secretary Alexander Hamilton, assumed the debts of the states, created the Bank of the United States, and set up a uniform system of tariffs and other taxes to pay off the debt and provide a financial infrastructure. Hamilton created the Federalist Party to support his programs. In 1791, to assuage the Anti-Federalists who feared a too-powerful central government, the Congress adopted the United States Bill of Rights by amending it to the U.S. Constitution, to guarantee individual liberties such as freedom of speech and religious practice.

Thomas Jefferson and James Madison formed an opposition Republican Party (usually called the Democratic-Republican Party). In 1794, Hamilton and Washington presented the country with the Jay Treaty which re-established good relations with Britain. The Jeffersonians vehemently protested, and the voters aligned behind one party or the other, thus setting up the First Party System. Although the treaty passed, politics became intensely heated. Serious challenges to the new federal government included the Northwest Indian War, the ongoing Cherokee–American wars, and the 1794 Whiskey Rebellion, in which western settlers protested against a federal tax on liquor.

Washington refused to serve more than two terms, setting a precedent for future administrations. John Adams of the Federalist Party defeated Jefferson in the 1796 election. War was looming with France, and the Federalists used the opportunity to try silencing the Republicans with the Alien and Sedition Acts; they also built up a large army with Hamilton at the head, in preparation for a French invasion. However, the Federalists became divided after Adams sent a successful peace mission to France that ended the Quasi-War of 1798.

=== Increasing demand for slave labor ===
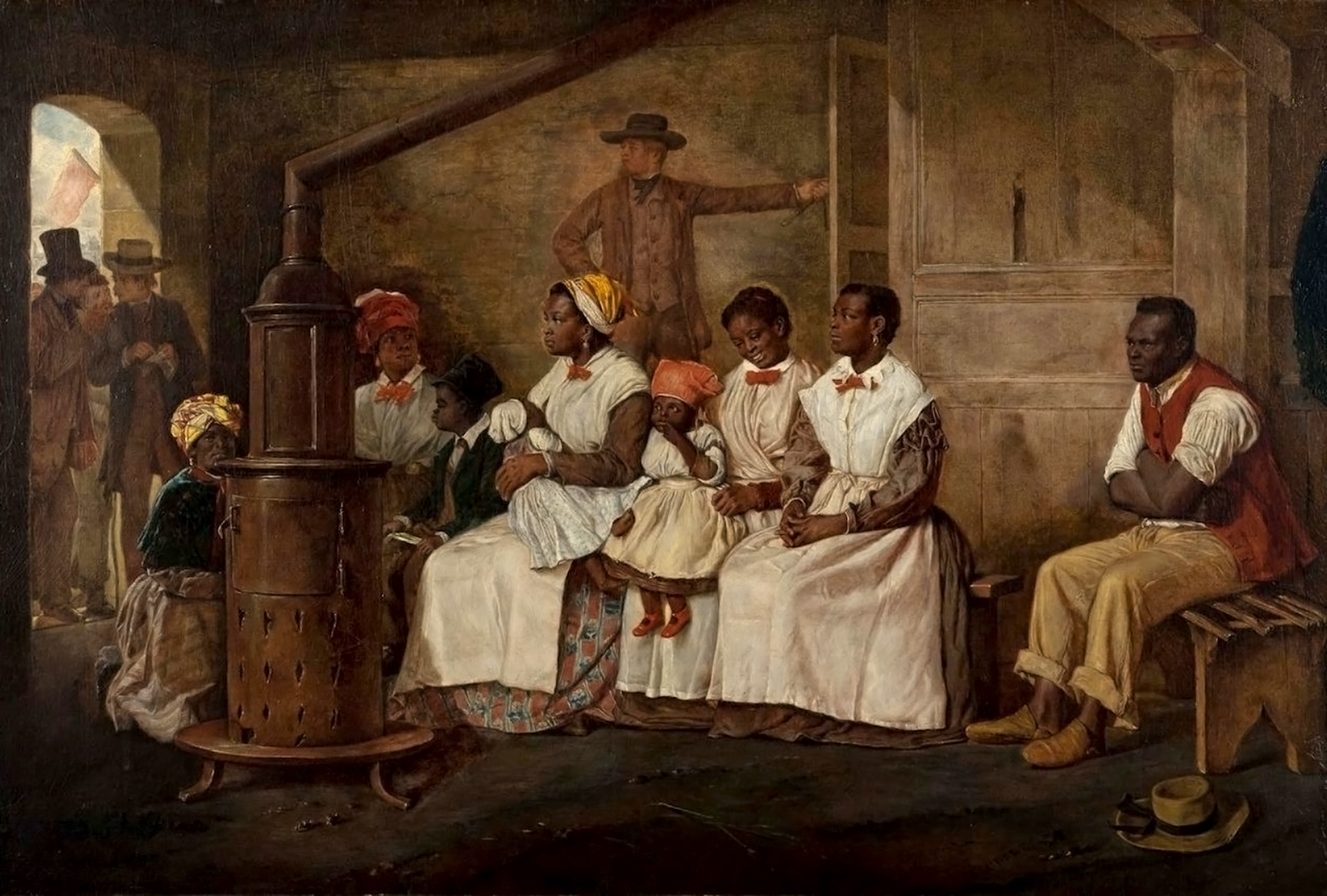
Slaves Waiting for Sale: Richmond, Virginia, an 1861 portrait by British painter Eyre Crowe

During the first two decades after the Revolutionary War, there were dramatic changes in the status of slavery among the states and an increase in the number of free blacks. Inspired by revolutionary ideals of equality, and influenced by their reduced economic reliance on the use of slaves, the Northern states abolished slavery.

States of the Upper South made manumission easier, resulting in an increase in the proportion of free blacks in the Upper South (as a percentage of the total non-white population) from less than one percent in 1792 to more than ten percent by 1810. By that date, a total of 13.5 percent of all blacks in the United States were free. In 1807, with four million slaves already in the United States, Congress severed U.S. involvement with the Atlantic slave trade.

=== Second Great Awakening ===
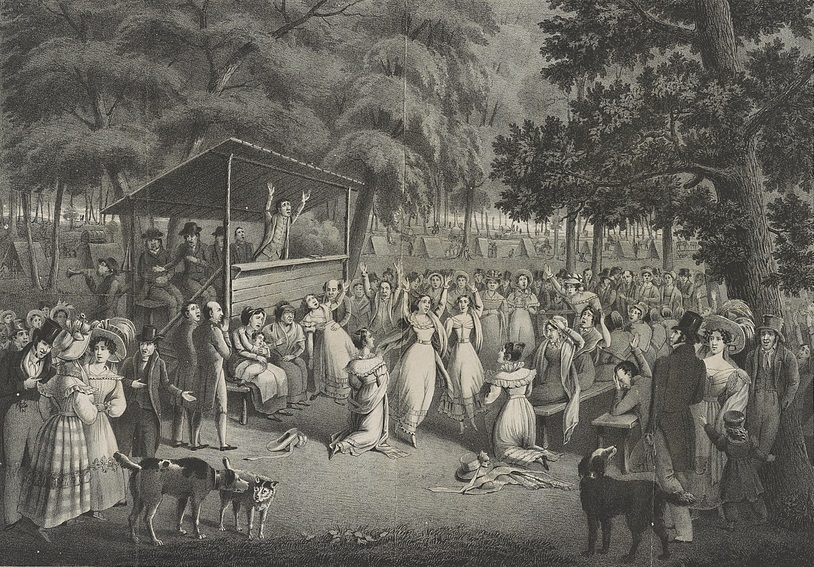
A drawing of a Protestant camp meeting, c. 1829

The Second Great Awakening was a Protestant revival movement that affected virtually all of society during the early 19th century and led to rapid church growth. It began around 1790 and was gaining momentum by 1800; its membership rose rapidly after 1820 among Baptist and Methodist congregations, whose preachers led the movement. It was past its peak by the 1840s.

The movement enrolled millions of new members in existing evangelical denominations and led to the formation of new denominations. The Second Great Awakening stimulated the establishment of many reform movements, including abolitionism and temperance.

=== Louisiana and Jeffersonian republicanism ===
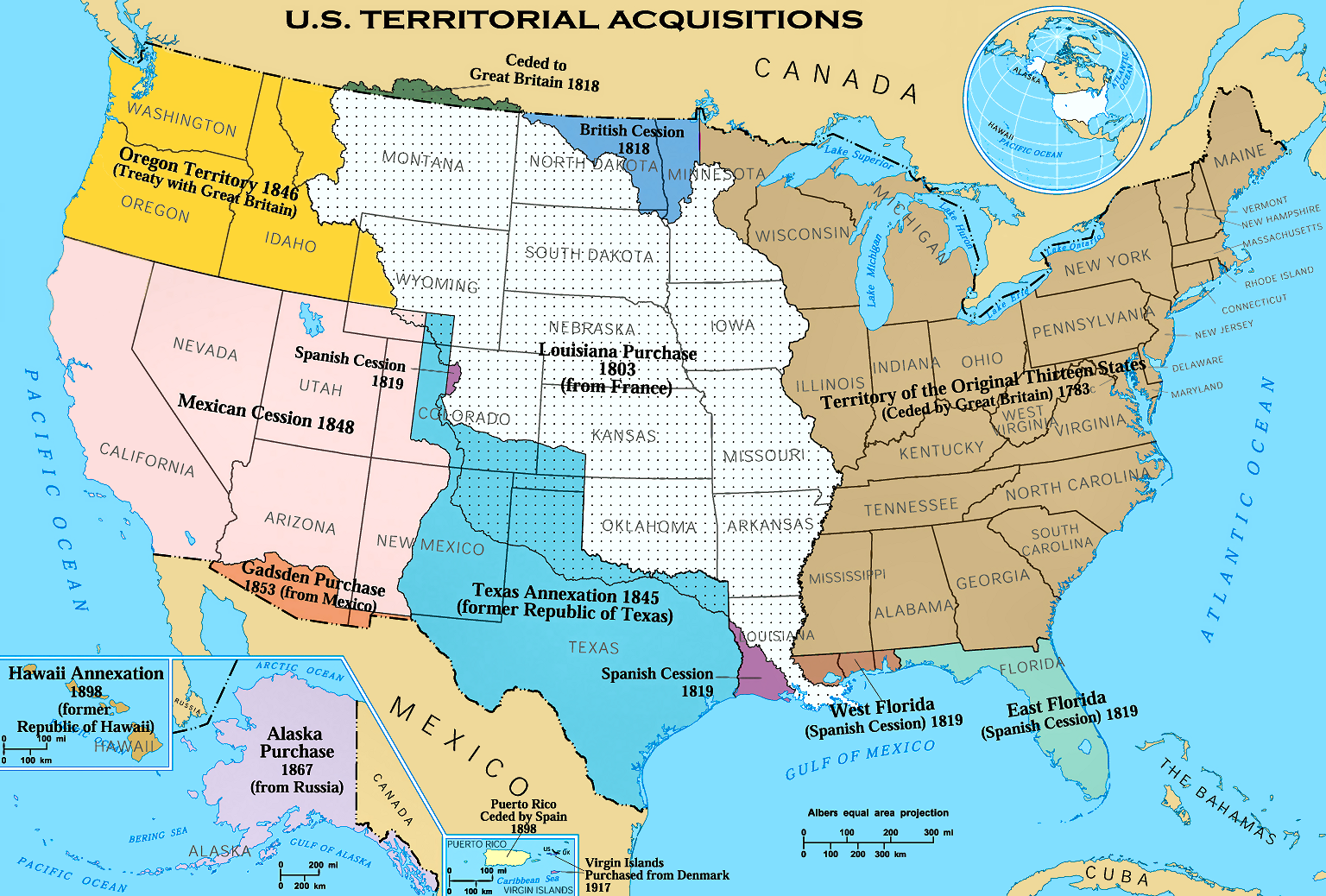
Land acquired in the Louisiana Purchase in 1803, highlighted in white

Thomas Jefferson defeated John Adams by a large margin in the 1800 presidential election. One of Jefferson's major achievements as president was the Louisiana Purchase from France in 1803, which provided U.S. settlers with vast potential for expansion west of the Mississippi River. He supported the Lewis and Clark Expedition to map this new domain.

Jefferson believed in republicanism and advocated that it should be based on the independent yeoman farmer and planter; he distrusted cities, factories and banks. He also distrusted the federal government and judges and he tried to weaken the judiciary. Although the Constitution specified a Supreme Court, its functions were vague until John Marshall, the Chief Justice of the United States (1801‍–‍1835), defined them. For example, the power to overturn acts of Congress or states that violated the Constitution was first enunciated in 1803 in the Marbury v. Madison case.

=== War of 1812 ===
During the early 19th century, Anglo-American relations deteriorated over a variety of reasons. British authorities began seizing American merchant ships trading with France and its allies, which intensified with the 1807 Orders in Council. Congress had passed the Embargo Act of 1807 in an unsuccessful attempt to coerce Britain to rescind the Orders in Council, which ultimately hurt the American economy more than the British. The Royal Navy, angered by thousands of its sailors deserting and finding work on American merchantmen, began stopping U.S. ships and reclaiming alleged deserters. Britain also provided support to Native Americans resisting expansion by U.S. colonizers, with the aim of forming an Indian barrier state which would halt American expansionism. Many American politicians also wished to occupy Canada, either as a bargaining chip for Anglo-American negotiations or to retain it as part of the US. Despite strong opposition from the Northeast, especially from Federalists who did not want to disrupt trade with Britain, Congress declared war on the United Kingdom on June 18, 1812.

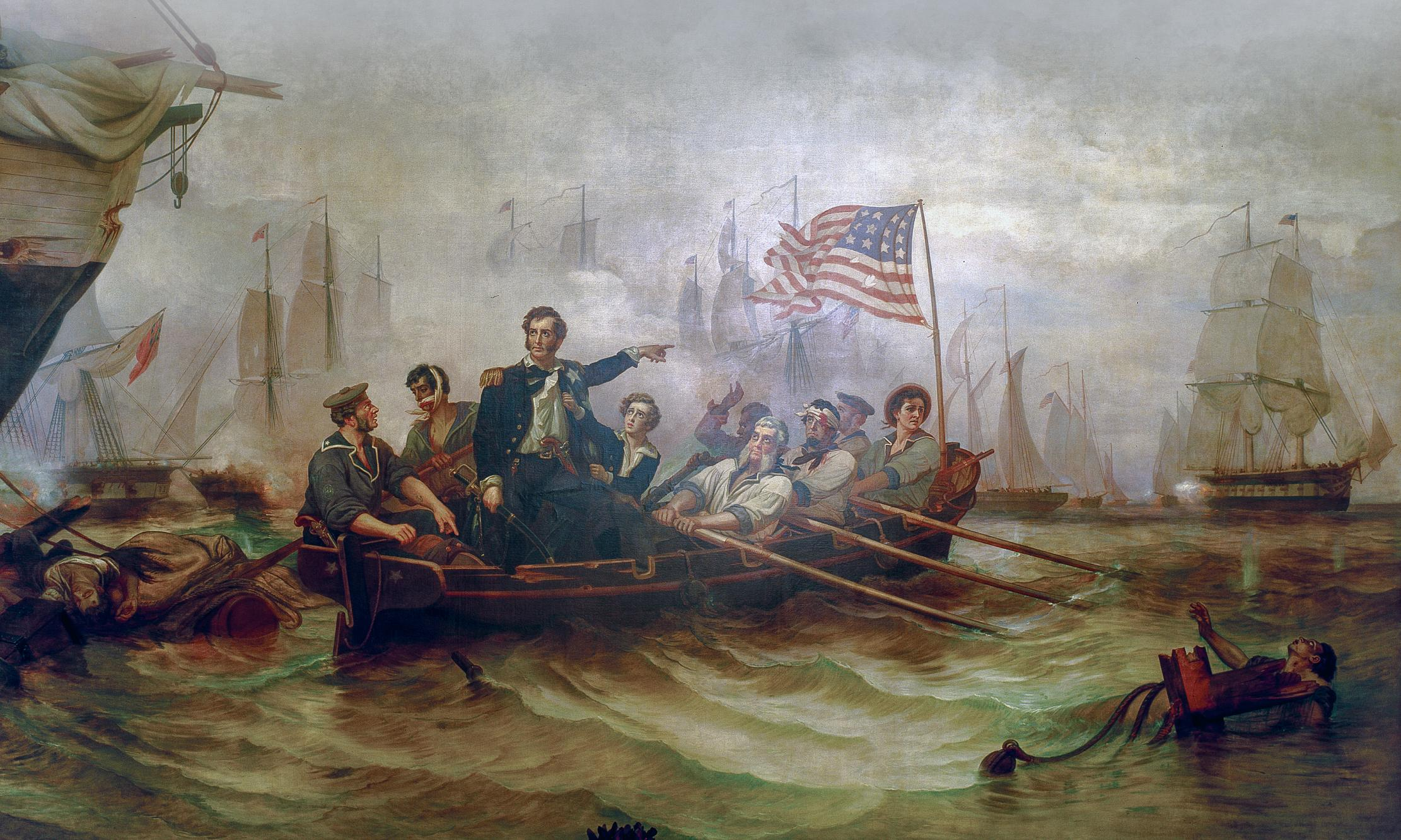
After the Battle of Lake Erie, Oliver Hazard Perry's message to William Henry Harrison began with: "We have met the enemy and they are ours", depicted in a 1865 painting by William H. Powell.

Both sides tried to invade the other and were repelled. The American militia proved ineffective because the soldiers were reluctant to leave home, and multiple American invasions of Canada were repulsed. British blockades ruined American commerce, bankrupted the Treasury, and further angered New Englanders who began smuggling supplies to Britain. Under General William Henry Harrison, the Americans eventually gained naval control of Lake Erie and defeated the Indians under Tecumseh in Canada, while Andrew Jackson ended the Indian threat in the Southeast. The Indian threat to expansion into the Midwest was permanently ended. The British invaded and occupied much of Maine.

In 1814, the British raided and burned Washington but were pushed back at Baltimore, where "The Star-Spangled Banner" was written to celebrate the American success. In upstate New York, a major British invasion of New York State was repelled at the Battle of Plattsburgh, and Jackson decisively defeated another invasion at the Battle of New Orleans in early 1815. The battle at New Orleans had occurred after peace had been signed between American and Britain in the Treaty of Ghent, but news of the treaty had not reached Louisiana before the battle occurred. Though the war had ended inconclusively and the U.S. had achieved few of war aims laid out in 1812, Jackson's victory at New Orleans led pro-war Americans to call it a "second war of independence"; the War of 1812 contributed to an emerging American identity that cemented national pride over state pride. The war also dispelled America's negative perception of a standing army as opposed to ill-equipped and poorly trained militias.

=== Era of Good Feelings ===
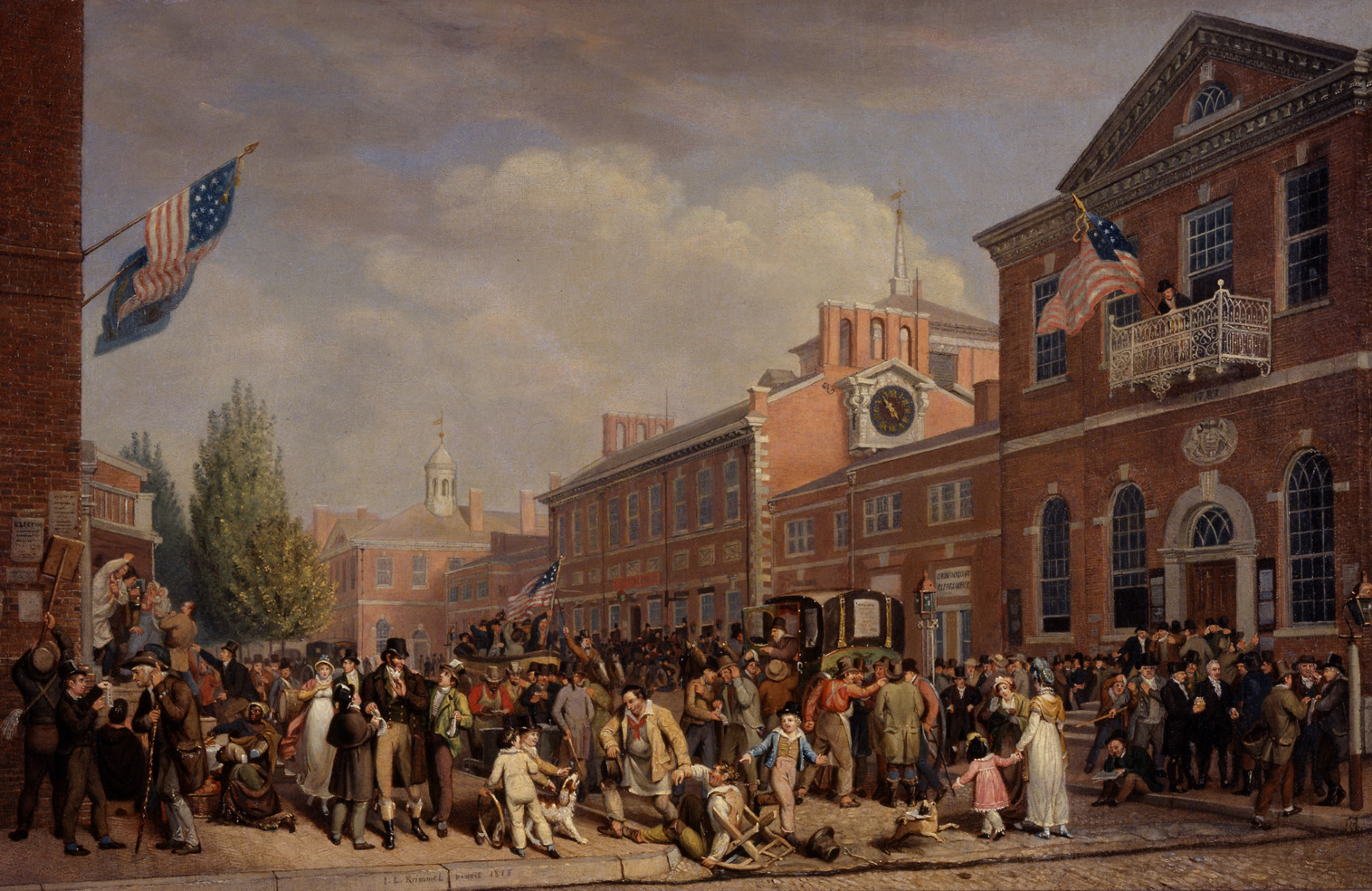
Depiction of election-day activities in Philadelphia by John Lewis Krimmel in 1815

National euphoria after the victory at New Orleans ruined the prestige of the Federalists, and they no longer played a significant role as a political party. President Madison and most of the Republicans realized they had been foolish to allow the First Bank of the United States to close down, for its absence had greatly hindered the financing of the war. With the assistance of foreign bankers, they chartered the Second Bank of the United States in 1816.

The Republicans also imposed tariffs designed to protect the infant industries that had been created when Britain was blockading the U.S. With the collapse of the Federalists as a party, the adoption of many Federalist principles by the Republicans, and the systematic policy of President James Monroe in his two terms (1817‍–‍1825) to downplay partisanship, society entered an Era of Good Feelings and closed out the First Party System.

Expressed in 1823, the Monroe Doctrine proclaimed the idealistic standpoint of the United States that European powers should no longer colonize or interfere in the Americas. This was a defining moment in U.S. foreign policy.

In 1832, President Andrew Jackson ran for a second term under the slogan "Jackson and no bank" and did not renew the Second Bank's charter, dissolving the bank in 1836. He was convinced that central banking was used by the elite to take advantage of the average American, and he opted instead to implement publicly owned banks in various U.S. states, popularly known as "pet banks".

== Expansion and reform (1830–1848) ==
=== Second Party System ===
The former Jeffersonian (Democratic-Republican) party split into factions over the choice of a successor to President James Monroe, and the party faction that supported many of the old Jeffersonian principles, led by Andrew Jackson and Martin Van Buren, became the Democratic Party. As Norton explains the transformation in 1828:

Jacksonians believed the people's will had finally prevailed. Through a lavishly financed coalition of state parties, political leaders, and newspaper editors, a popular movement had elected the president. The Democrats became the nation's first well-organized national party, and tight party organization became the hallmark of nineteenth-century American politics.

Opposing factions led by Henry Clay helped form the Whig Party. The Democratic Party had a small but decisive advantage over the Whigs until the 1850s, when the Whigs fell apart over the issue of slavery.

=== Westward expansion and manifest destiny ===
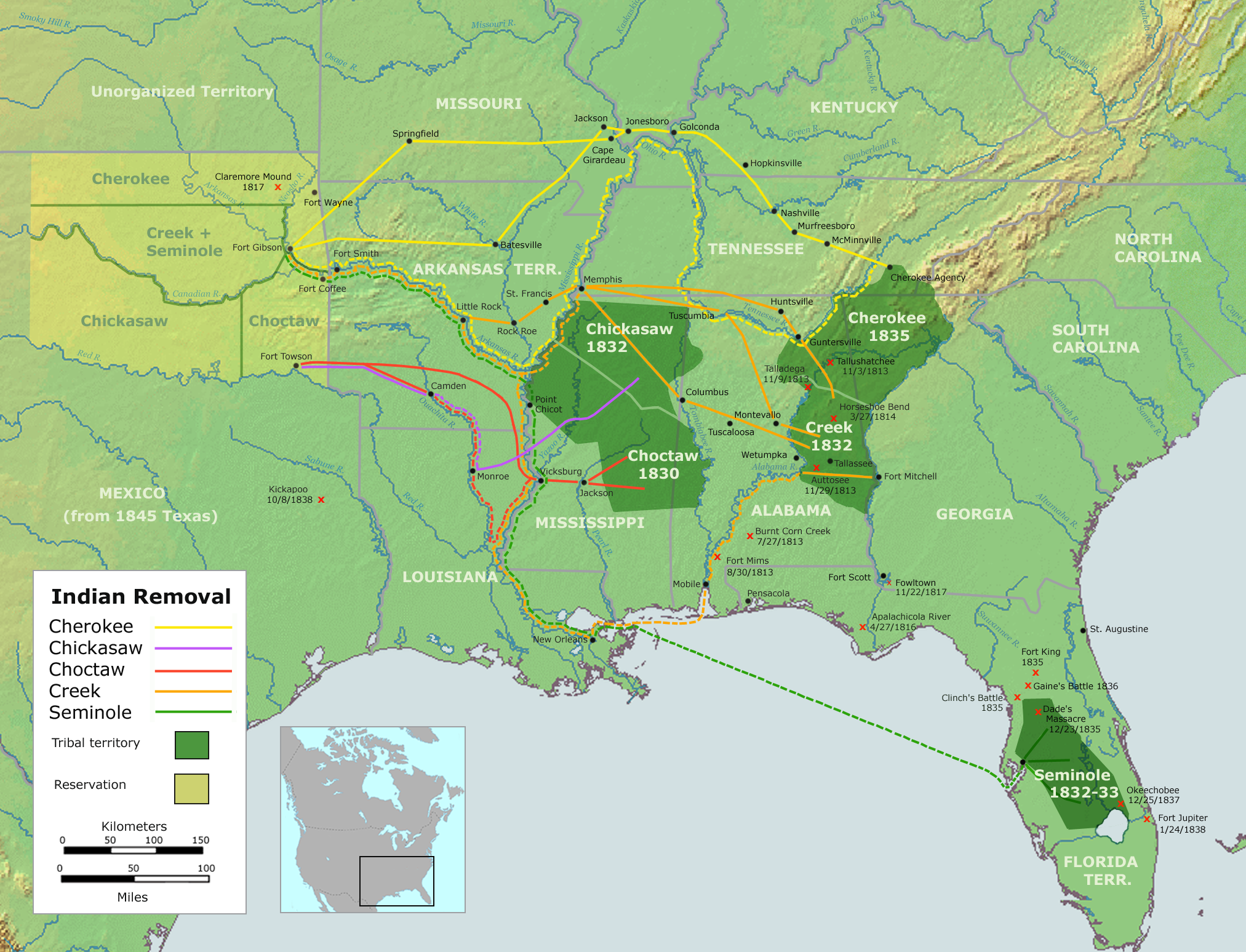
The Indian Removal Act resulted in the transplantation of several Native American tribes and the Trail of Tears

The country grew rapidly in population and area, as pioneers pushed the frontier of settlement west. Native American tribes in some places resisted militarily, but they were overwhelmed by settlers and the army, and after 1830, were relocated to reservations in the west. That year, Congress passed the Indian Removal Act, which authorized the president to negotiate treaties that exchanged Native American tribal lands in the eastern states for lands west of the Mississippi River. Its goal was primarily to remove Native Americans, including the Five Civilized Tribes, from desirable lands in what's now Oklahoma. Thousands of deaths resulted from the relocations, as seen in the Cherokee Trail of Tears, most infamously of which resulted in approximately 4,000 of the 16,000 relocated Cherokee dying along the way in 1838. Many of the Seminole Indians in Florida refused to move west, and fought the Army for years in the Seminole Wars.

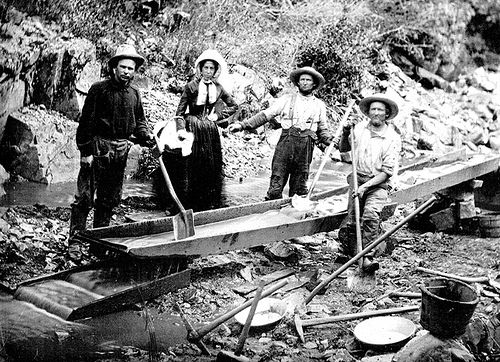
During the California Gold Rush, some 300,000 people relocated to California from the rest of the United States and abroad following the discovery of gold in the state.

Manifest destiny was the belief that American settlers were destined to expand across the continent. Manifest destiny was rejected by modernizers, especially the Whigs like Henry Clay and Abraham Lincoln who wanted to build cities and factories – not more farms. (Note: Howe argued that, "American imperialism did not represent an American consensus; it provoked bitter dissent within the national polity.") Democrats strongly favored expansion, and won the key election of 1844. After a bitter debate in Congress, the Republic of Texas was annexed in 1845, leading to the Mexican–American War. The U.S. Army invaded Mexico at several points, captured Mexico City, and won the war decisively.

The Treaty of Guadalupe Hidalgo ended the war in 1848. In the treaty, the U.S. acquired much of the American Southwest, including California and New Mexico, with Mexico being paid $15 million in compensation. Many Democrats wanted to annex all of Mexico, but that idea was rejected by White Southerners, who argued that incorporating millions of Mexican people, mainly of mixed race, would undermine the U.S. as an exclusively white republic. Instead, the U.S. took Texas and the lightly settled northern parts (California and New Mexico). Simultaneously, gold was discovered in California in 1848, and led to over 100,000 white settlers flocking to California in 1849, the California Gold Rush miners, known as '49ers. California grew rapidly, and by 1850, the non-native population went from 1,000 to over 125,000 people by 1850. However, many Indians were devastated by the rapid influx of the rush of white settlers in the 1850s, and to clear the state for white settlement, the U.S. government began a policy of forcibly removing and exterminating the natives, now known as the California genocide. From the early 1830s to 1869, the Oregon Trail and its offshoots were used by over 300,000 settlers headed to California, Oregon, and other points in the far west. Wagon trains took five or six months on foot.

A peaceful compromise with Britain gave the U.S. ownership of the Oregon Country, which was renamed the Oregon Territory. The demand for guano, prized as an agricultural fertilizer, led the U.S. to pass the Guano Islands Act in 1856, which enabled U.S. citizens to take possession, in the name of the country, of unclaimed islands containing guano deposits. Under the act, the U.S. annexed nearly 100 islands in the Pacific Ocean and the Caribbean Sea. By 1903, 66 of these islands were recognized as U.S. territories.

The women's suffrage movement began with the Seneca Falls Convention in 1848. It was organized by women's rights advocates and abolitionists, Elizabeth Cady Stanton and Lucretia Mott. The convention began on July 19, 1848, in the town of Seneca Falls, New York, with 300 people in attendance, and concluded the next day with signing the Declaration of Sentiments demanding equal rights for women, including the right to vote. (Note: The Seneca Falls Convention was preceded by the Anti-Slavery Convention of American Women in 1837 held in New York City, at which women's rights issues were debated, especially African-American women's rights.) The women's rights campaign during first-wave feminism was led by Elizabeth Cady Stanton, Lucy Stone and Susan B. Anthony, among others. Stone and Paulina Wright Davis organized the prominent and influential National Women's Rights Convention in 1850.

== Civil War and Reconstruction (1848–1877) ==
=== Divisions between North and South ===
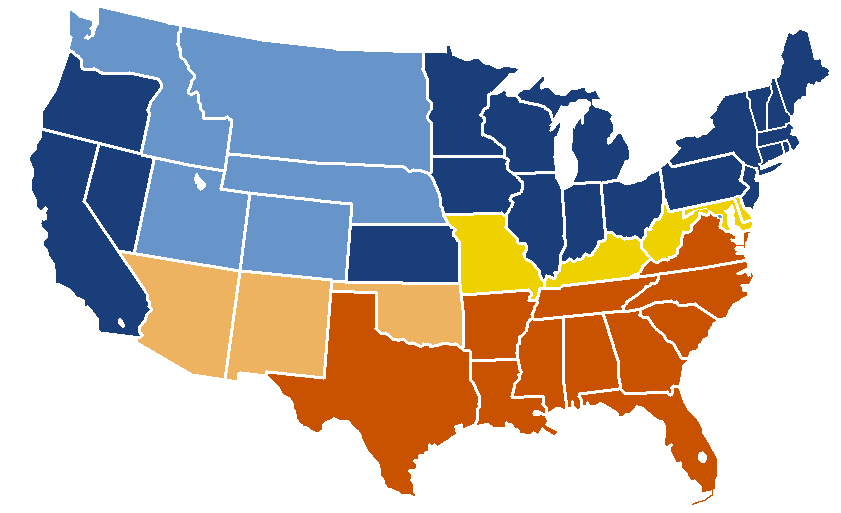
An 1863 map of the United States during the American Civil War, showing the affiliation of states and territories Union states Union territories not permitting slavery Border Union states, permitting slavery Confederate states Union territories permitting slavery (claimed by Confederacy)

The central issue after 1848 was the expansion of slavery, with the anti-slavery elements in the North pitted against the pro-slavery elements in the South. By 1860, there were four million slaves in the South. A small number of Northerners called abolitionists sought the immediate abolition of slavery, while much larger numbers in the North were opposed to the expansion of slavery and sought to put it on the path to extinction.

There was resistance to slavery by both peaceful and violent means. Slave rebellions by Gabriel Prosser (1800), Denmark Vesey (1822) and Nat Turner (1831), caused fear in the white South, where stricter oversight of slaves was imposed, and the rights of free Black people were reduced. Southern white Democrats insisted that slavery was of economic, social, and cultural benefit, even to the slaves themselves. Supporters of slavery argued that a sudden end to the slave economy would have a fatal economic impact in the South, causing widespread unemployment and chaos; slave labor was the foundation of their economy.

The plantations were highly profitable because of the heavy European demand for raw cotton. Northern cities and regional industries were tied economically to slavery through banking, shipping, and manufacturing, including their textile mills. In addition, Southern states benefited from slavery by having an increased apportionment in Congress due to the partial counting of slaves in their populations.

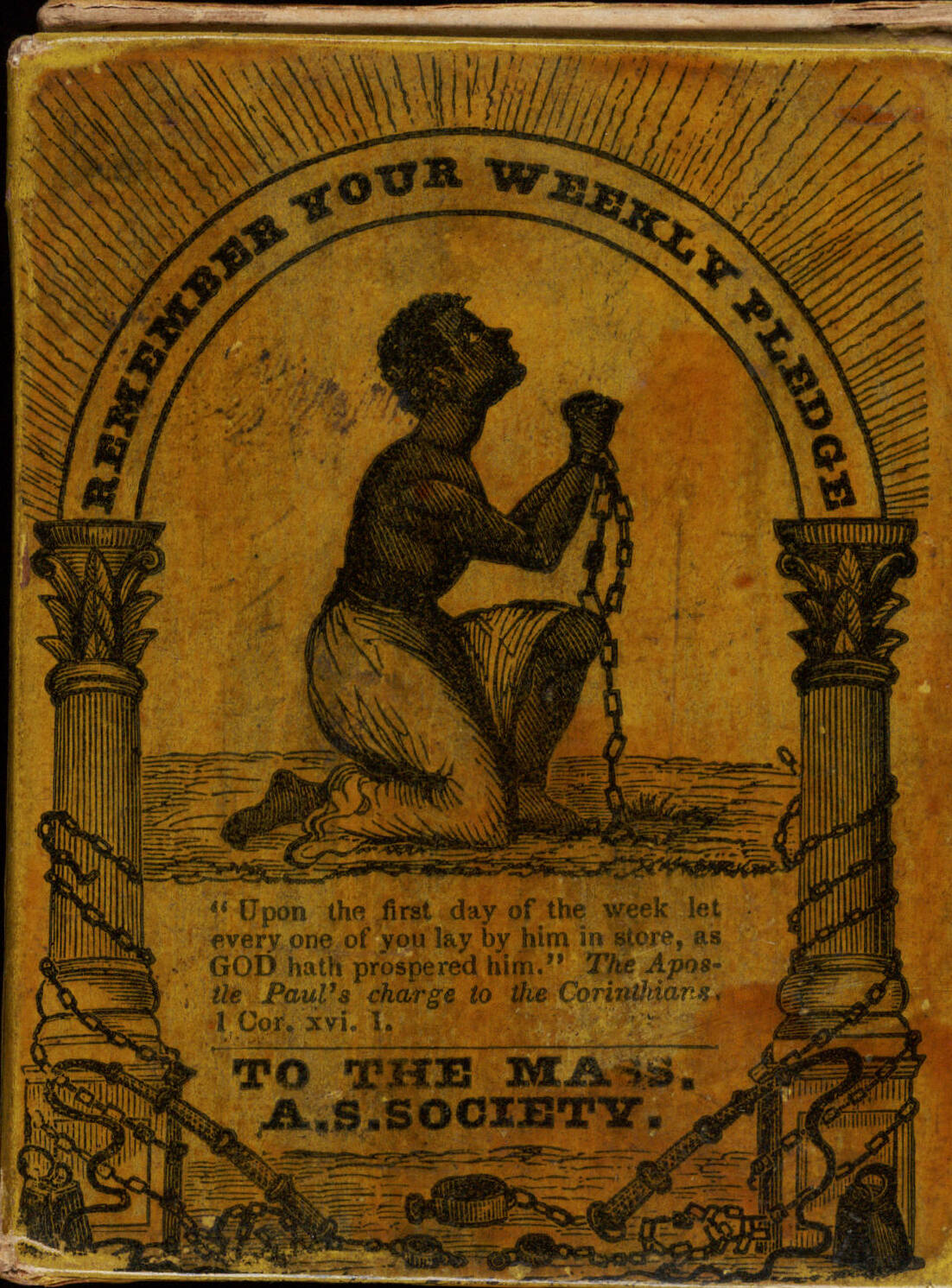
Remember Your Weekly Pledge, a collection box for the Massachusetts Anti-Slavery Society in 1850

The issue of slavery in the new territories was seemingly settled by the Compromise of 1850, which included the admission of California as a free state in exchange for no federal restrictions on slavery placed on Utah or New Mexico. A point of contention was the Fugitive Slave Act, requiring free states to cooperate with slave owners when attempting to capture escaped slaves who defected via the Underground Railroad, while punishing those who aided runaway slaves. The act garnered outrage in the North, as they were forced to play a role in Southern slavery.

The Missouri Compromise was repealed in 1854 with the Kansas–Nebraska Act; promoted by Stephen Douglas in the name of "popular sovereignty" and democracy, this act of Congress permitted voters to decide on the legality of slavery in each territory, and repealed the Missouri Compromise of 1820, which explicitly banned slavery in this territory. Anti-slavery forces rose in anger and alarm, forming the new Republican Party to oppose the expansion of slavery out west. Pro- and anti- slavery settlers rushed to Kansas to vote for or against slavery, resulting in years of bloodshed and violence called Bleeding Kansas. By the late 1850s, the young Republican Party dominated nearly all Northern states, and hence the electoral colleges. The party insisted that slavery would never be allowed to expand and would therefore slowly die out.

The Supreme Court's 1857 decision in Dred Scott v. Sandford ruled that the Compromise was unconstitutional, and that free Black people were not U.S. citizens, and therefore unable to sue for their freedom. The decision enraged Northerners, and the Republicans worried that the decision could be used to expand slavery. The decision exacerbated tensions over slavery.

=== Civil War ===
After Republican Abraham Lincoln won the 1860 election, seven Southern states seceded from the Union and formed the Confederate States of America (Confederacy) on February 8, 1861, to persevere the institution of slavery. The Civil War began on April 12, 1861, when Confederate forces attacked a U.S. military installation at Fort Sumter in South Carolina. In response, Lincoln called on the states to send militiamen to recapture forts, protect Washington D.C., and "preserve the Union". Lincoln's call led to four more states seceding and joining the Confederacy. A few of the (northernmost) slave states did not secede and became known as the border states; these were Delaware, Maryland, Kentucky, and Missouri. During the war, the northwestern portion of Virginia seceded from the Confederacy, becoming the new Union state of West Virginia.

The two armies' first major battle was the First Battle of Bull Run, which the Confederate victory proved to both sides that the war would be much longer than anticipated. In the western theater, the Union Army was relatively successful, with major battles such as Perryville and Shiloh, along with Union Navy gunboat dominance of navigable rivers producing strategic Union victories and destroying major Confederate operations. Warfare in the eastern theater began poorly for the Union. U.S. General George B. McClellan failed to capture the Confederate capital of Richmond, Virginia, in his Peninsula campaign and retreated after attacks from Confederate General Robert E. Lee.

Meanwhile, in 1861 and 1862, both sides concentrated on raising and training new armies. The Union successfully gained control of the border states, driving the Confederates out. Lee's Army of Northern Virginia won battles in late 1862 and spring 1863, but he pushed too hard and ignored the Union threat in the west. He invaded Pennsylvania in search of supplies and to cause war-weariness in the North. On September 17, 1862, the Battle of Antietam was fought in Maryland, which would result in over 23,000 casualties in bloodiest day of the Civil War.

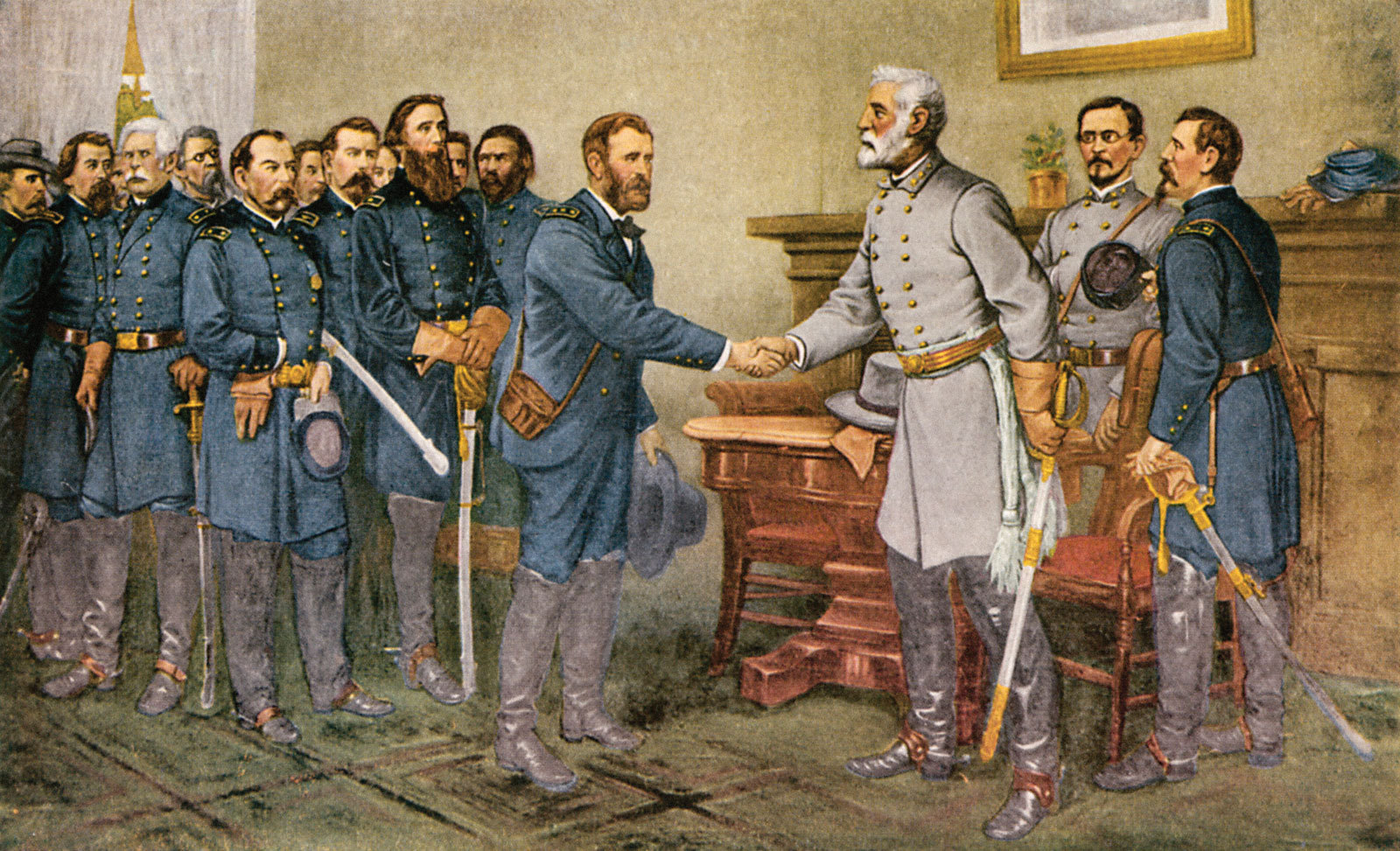
A portrait of Robert E. Lee and the Confederate States Army surrendering to the Union Army following the Battle of Appomattox Court House in Appomattox County, Virginia, on April 9, 1865

The Emancipation Proclamation, issued by Lincoln on January 1, 1863, freed three million slaves in designated areas of the Confederacy to weaken the Confederate's troops and supplies. In perhaps the turning point of the war, Lee's army was badly beaten by the Army of the Potomac, and in July 1863, the Union's victory at the Battle of Gettysburg in Pennsylvania, the deadliest battle in American military history with over 50,000 casualties, proved a turning point in the war. Survivors of the battle were immediately redeployed to suppress the New York City draft riots by Irish Americans protesting Civil War conscription and the city's free Black population.

In July 1863, Union forces under General Ulysses S. Grant gained control of the Mississippi River at the Battle of Vicksburg, splitting the Confederacy. In 1864, Union General William Tecumseh Sherman marched south from Chattanooga to capture Atlanta, a decisive victory that ended war jitters among Republicans in the North and helped Lincoln win re-election. Sherman's march to the sea was almost unopposed. Much of the South was destroyed, and could no longer provide desperately needed supplies to its armies. In spring 1864, Grant launched a war of attrition and pursued Lee to the final Appomattox campaign, which resulted in Lee surrendering in April 1865, ending the war after four years. By May 1865, the Union Army controlled all of the Confederacy and liberated all of the designated slaves.

The Civil War was the world's earliest industrial war. Railroads, the telegraph, steamships, and mass-produced weapons were employed extensively. Civilian factories, mines, and shipyards were mobilized. Foreign trade increased, with the U.S. providing both food and cotton to Britain, and Britain sending in manufactured products and thousands of volunteers for the Union Army, and a few to the Confederate army. The Union blockade shut down Confederate ports. It remains the deadliest war in American history, resulting in the deaths of about 750,000 soldiers and an undetermined number of civilian casualties. (Note: A new way of calculating casualties by looking at the deviation of the death rate of men of fighting age from the norm through analysis of census data found that at least 627,000 and at most 888,000 people, but most likely 761,000 people, died through the war.) About ten percent of all Northern males 20–45 years old, and thirty percent of all Southern white males aged 18–40 died. Many Black people died after being dislocated during the war and Reconstruction.

=== Reconstruction ===
Reconstruction followed after the end of the war. Days after the American Civil War ended with the Union victory and the surrender of the Appatomox Court House. Lincoln was assassinated at Ford's Theater in Washington D.C. in April 1865 by John Wilkes Booth, and was succeeded by Andrew Johnson.

A May 10, 1869, picture of the completion of the first transcontinental railroad in Promontory, Utah

After the war, the far west was developed and settled, first by wagon trains and riverboats, and then by the first transcontinental railroad in 1869. Many Northern European immigrants took up low-cost or free farms in the Prairie States. Mining for silver and copper encouraged development.

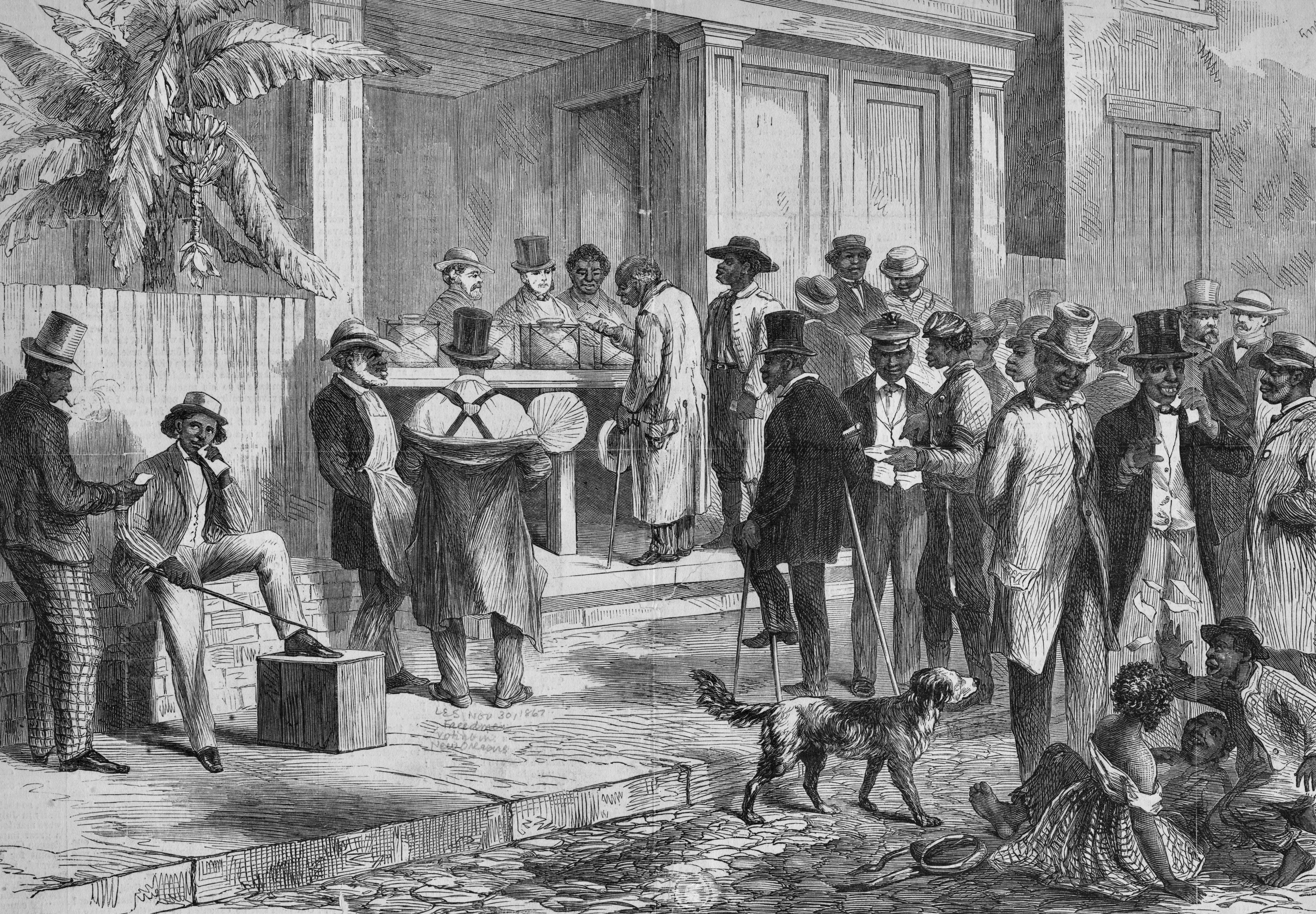
An illustration of African-American Freedmen voting in New Orleans in 1867

The severe threats of starvation and displacement of the unemployed Freedmen were met by the first major federal relief agency, the Freedmen's Bureau, operated by the Army. The bureau also took in freed slaves. Three "Reconstruction Amendments" expanded civil rights for black Americans: the 1865 Thirteenth Amendment outlawed slavery; the 1868 Fourteenth Amendment guaranteed equal rights and citizenship for Black people; the 1870 Fifteenth Amendment prevented race from being used to disenfranchise men.

Ex-Confederates remained in control of most Southern states for over two years, until the Radical Republicans gained control of Congress in the 1866 elections. Johnson, who sought good treatment for ex-Confederates, was virtually powerless in the face of Congress and vetoed many civil rights laws; he was impeached in 1868, but the Senate's attempt to remove him from office failed by one vote. Congress enfranchised black men and temporarily banned many ex-Confederate leaders from holding office. New Republican governments came to power based on a coalition of Freedmen made up of Carpetbaggers (new arrivals from the North), and Scalawags (native white Southerners), backed by the Army. Opponents said they were corrupt and violated the rights of whites.

During Reconstruction, for a brief period, many freed blacks could vote, and even hold public office as the Republicans occupied the South. In response to Radical Reconstruction, the Ku Klux Klan (KKK) emerged in 1865 as a white-supremacist terrorist organization opposed to black civil rights and Republican rule. President Ulysses Grant's enforcement of the Ku Klux Klan Act of 1871 shut them down. Paramilitary groups, such as the White League and Red Shirts emerging around 1874, openly intimidated and attacked Black people voting.

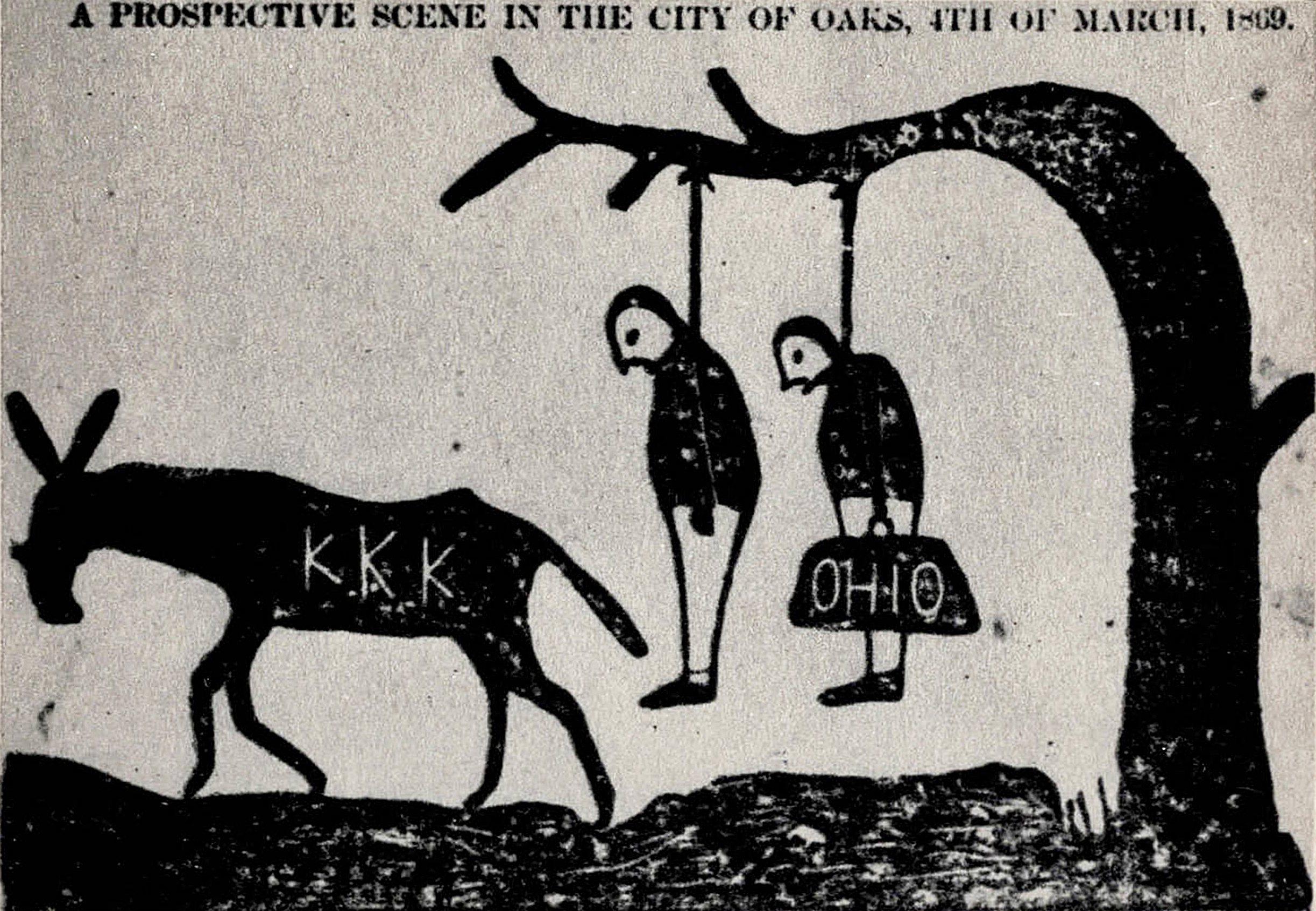
A September 1, 1868, cartoon from Tuscaloosa's Independent Monitor, threatening that the KKK will lynch scalawags (left) and carpetbaggers (right) the day President Ulysses S. Grant takes office in 1869

Reconstruction ended after the disputed 1876 election. The Compromise of 1877 gave Republican Rutherford B. Hayes the presidency in exchange for removing all remaining federal troops in the South, as the Democrats regained control of the Congress, and Reconstruction came to an end in 1877. As a result, the southern states passes harsh laws on African-Americans known as Jim Crow laws, that effectively disenfranchised Black and poor white voters by making voter registration more difficult through poll taxes and literacy tests. Black people were segregated from whites in the violently enforced Jim Crow system, and lynchings and threats of violence against blacks were commonplace. In 1882, the United States passed the Chinese Exclusion Act (which barred all Chinese immigrants except for students and businessmen), and the Immigration Act of 1882 (which barred all immigrants with mental health issues).

=== Railroads ===
The railroad produced as profound a change in the 1800s as electricity did in the 20th century. As historian Chester Wright put it, "Its revolutionizing effects can scarcely be exaggerated." The first transcontinental railroad cut the time it took to get across the country from months down to days. Even more importantly, it cut freight rates down to a small fraction of what they had been with wagon transport.

Prior to the Civil War, average rail freight rates were 3 cents per ton-mile (A "ton-mile" is one ton of freight hauled one mile.), compared to 15 cents by wagon. Rail freight rates fell even further, and were less than 1 cent per ton-mile by 1895. For example, a farmer in the West might have a load of corn that was worth $100 in Chicago, but it would cost $100 to get it there by wagon. So, farming wasn't profitable in most of the West. The coming of the railroad changed this – dramatically. Instantaneously, freight rates dropped to a small fraction of what they had been by wagon. As a result, farming throughout the West could be done at a profit. So could mining, logging and ranching.

All forms of economic activity increased significantly in the 1800s as a result of low-cost rail transportation. As historian George Rogers Taylor put it, "The magnitude of this change was so great as to permit a major revolution in domestic commerce."

When Thomas Jefferson bought the Louisiana Purchase in 1803, people thought it would take 300 years to populate it. With the coming of the railroad, it was accomplished in only 30 years.

== Gilded Age and the Progressive Era (1877–1914) ==
=== After Reconstruction ===
The "Gilded Age" was a term that Mark Twain used to describe the period of the late 19th century with a dramatic expansion of American wealth and prosperity, underscored by mass corruption in government. Some historians have argued that the United States was effectively plutocratic for at least part of the era. As financiers and industrialists such as J.P. Morgan and John D. Rockefeller began to amass vast fortunes, many observers were concerned that the nation was losing its pioneering egalitarian spirit.

An unprecedented wave of immigration from Europe served to both provide the labor for American industry and create diverse communities in previously undeveloped areas. From 1880 to 1914, peak years of immigration, more than 22 million people migrated to the country. Most were unskilled workers who quickly found jobs in mines, mills, and factories. Many immigrants were craftsmen and farmers who purchased inexpensive land on the prairies. Poverty, growing inequality and dangerous working conditions, along with socialist and anarchist ideas diffusing from European immigrants, led to the rise of the labor movement.

Dissatisfaction on the part of the growing middle class with the corruption and inefficiency of politics, and the failure to deal with increasingly important urban and industrial problems, led to the dynamic progressive movement starting in the 1890s. Progressives called for the modernization and reform of decrepit institutions in the fields of politics, education, medicine, and industry. "Muckraking" journalists exposed corruption in business and government, and highlighted rampant inner-city poverty. Progressives implemented antitrust laws and regulated such industries of meatpacking, drugs, and railroads. Four new constitutional amendments – the Sixteenth through Nineteenth – resulted from progressive activism, bringing the federal income tax, direct election of Senators, prohibition, and female suffrage.

In 1881, President James A. Garfield was assassinated by Charles Guiteau.

==== Unions and strikes ====
A Harpers Weekly illustration by Frederic Remington depicting hundreds of boxcars and coal cars looted and burned and state and federal troops violently attacked striking workers on July 7, 1894

Skilled workers banded together to control their crafts and raise wages by forming labor unions in industrial areas of the Northeast. Samuel Gompers led the American Federation of Labor (1886–1924), coordinating multiple unions. In response to heavy debts and decreasing farm prices, wheat and cotton farmers joined the Populist Party.

The Panic of 1893 created a severe nationwide depression. Many railroads went bankrupt. Labor unrest involved numerous strikes, most notably the violent Pullman Strike of 1894, which was forcibly shut down by federal troops. One of the disillusioned leaders of the Pullman strike, Eugene V. Debs, went on to become the leader of the Socialist Party of America.

==== Economic growth ====
Important legislation of the era included the 1883 Civil Service Act, which mandated a competitive examination for applicants for government jobs, the 1887 Interstate Commerce Act, which ended railroads' discrimination against small shippers, and the 1890 Sherman Antitrust Act, which outlawed monopolies in business.

After 1893, the Populist Party gained strength among farmers and coal miners, but was overtaken by the even more popular Free silver movement, which demanded using silver to enlarge the money supply and end the depression. Financial and railroad communities fought back hard, arguing that only the gold standard would save the economy. In the 1896 presidential election, conservative Republican William McKinley defeated silverite William Jennings Bryan.

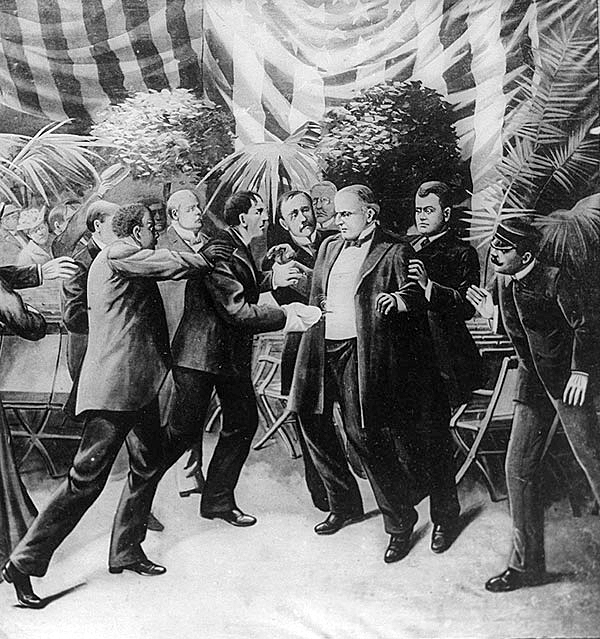
The assassination of William McKinley by Leon Czolgosz in Buffalo, New York on September 6, 1901, depicted in a portrait by T. Dart Walker

Prosperity returned under McKinley. The gold standard was enacted, and the tariff was raised. By 1900, the U.S. had the strongest economy in the world. McKinley was assassinated by Leon Czolgosz in 1901, and was succeeded by Theodore Roosevelt.

The period also saw a major transformation of the banking system, with the arrival of the first credit union in 1908 and the creation of the Federal Reserve System in 1913. Apart from two short recessions in 1907 and 1920, the economy remained prosperous and growing until 1929.

==== Imperialism ====
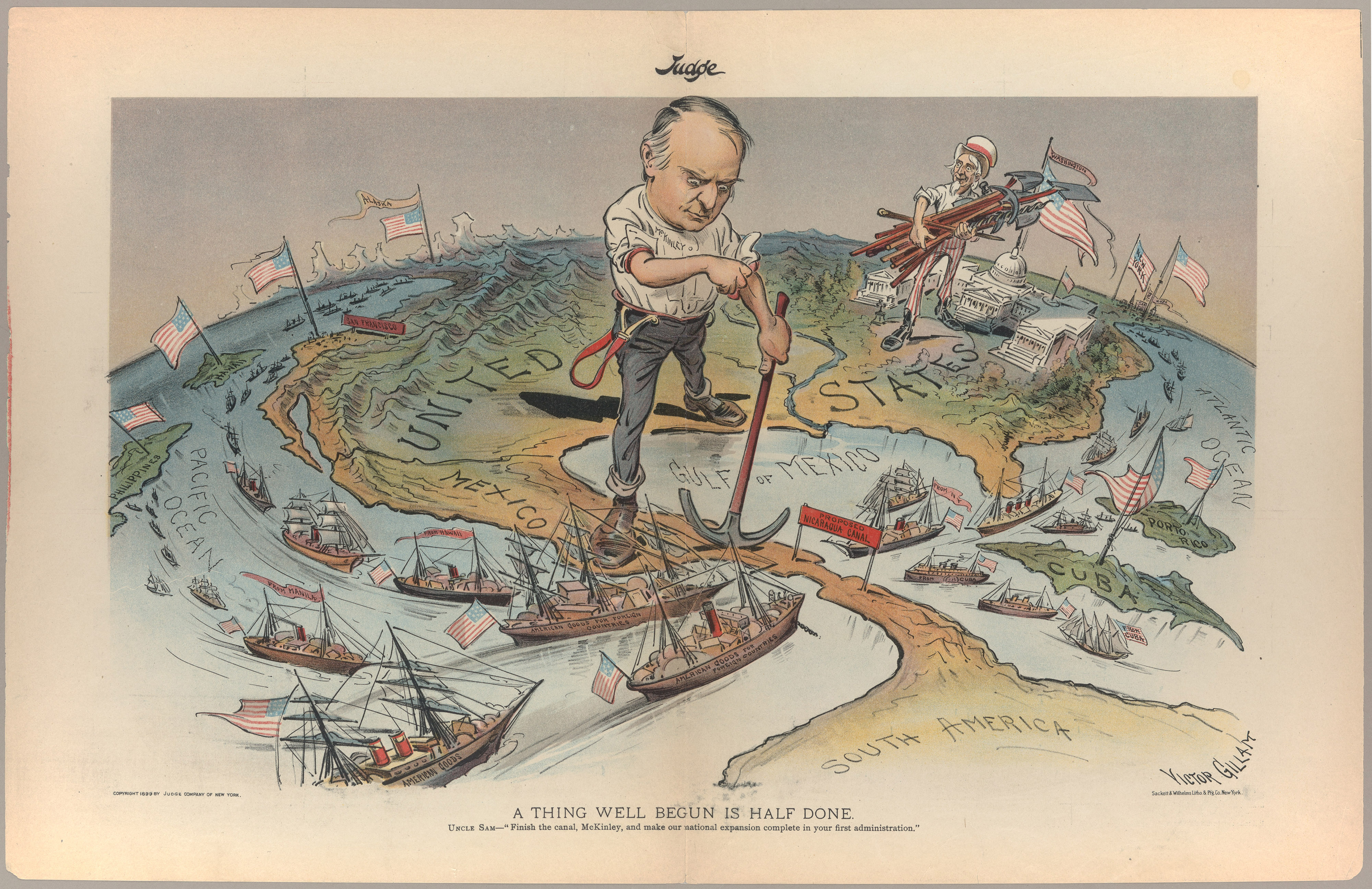
A cartoon reflecting Judge magazine view that the U.S. maintained imperial ambitions following its quick victory in the Spanish–American War in 1898

The United States Army continued to fight wars with Native Americans as settlers encroached on their traditional lands. Gradually the U.S. purchased tribal lands and extinguished their claims, forcing most tribes onto subsidized reservations. According to the U.S. Census Bureau in 1894, from 1789 to 1894, the Indian Wars killed 19,000 white people and more than 30,000 Indians.

The Spanish–American War began when Spain refused American demands to reform its oppressive policies in Cuba. The war was a series of quick American victories on land and at sea. At the Treaty of Paris peace conference the United States acquired the Philippines, Puerto Rico, and Guam. Cuba became an independent country, under close American tutelage. William Jennings Bryan led his Democratic Party in opposition to control of the Philippines, which he denounced as imperialism. After defeating an insurrection by Filipino nationalists, the United States achieved little in the Philippines except in education. Infrastructural development lost much of its early vigor with the failure of the railroads.

By 1908, however, Americans lost interest in an empire and turned their international attention to the Caribbean, especially the building of the Panama Canal. The canal opened in 1914 and increased trade with Japan and the rest of the Far East. A key innovation was the Open Door Policy, whereby the imperial powers were given equal access to Chinese business, with none of them allowed to take control of China.

==== Women's suffrage ====
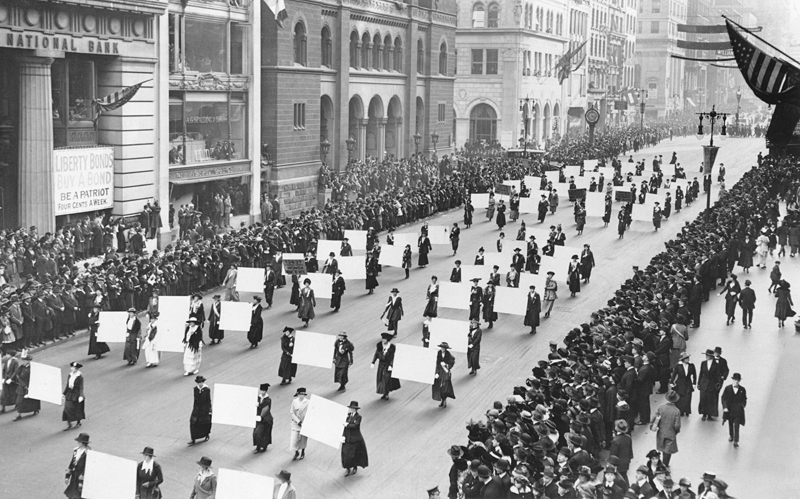
A Women's suffragists parade in New York City in October 1917, featuring placards with the signatures of more than a million women

The women's suffrage movement reorganized after the Civil War. By the end of the 19th century, a few Western states had granted women full voting rights, and women gained rights in areas such as property and child custody law.

Around 1912, the feminist movement reawakened, putting an emphasis on its demands for equality and arguing that the corruption of American politics demanded purification by women. Alice Paul split from the large, moderate National American Woman Suffrage Association (NAWSA), led by Carrie Chapman Catt, and formed the more militant National Woman's Party. Suffragists were arrested during their "Silent Sentinels" pickets at the White House and taken as political prisoners.

The anti-suffragist argument that only men could fight in a war, therefore only men deserved the right to vote, was refuted by the participation of American women on the home front in World War I. The success of women's suffrage was demonstrated by the politics of some U.S. states that were already allowing women to vote, including Montana, which elected the first woman to the House of Representatives, Jeannette Rankin. The main resistance came from the South, where white leaders were worried about the threat of black women being allowed to vote. Congress passed the Nineteenth Amendment in 1919, and women first voted in 1920. Politicians responded to the new electorate by emphasizing issues of special interest to women, especially prohibition, child health, and world peace.

== Modern America and World Wars (1914–1945) ==
=== World War I and the interwar years ===
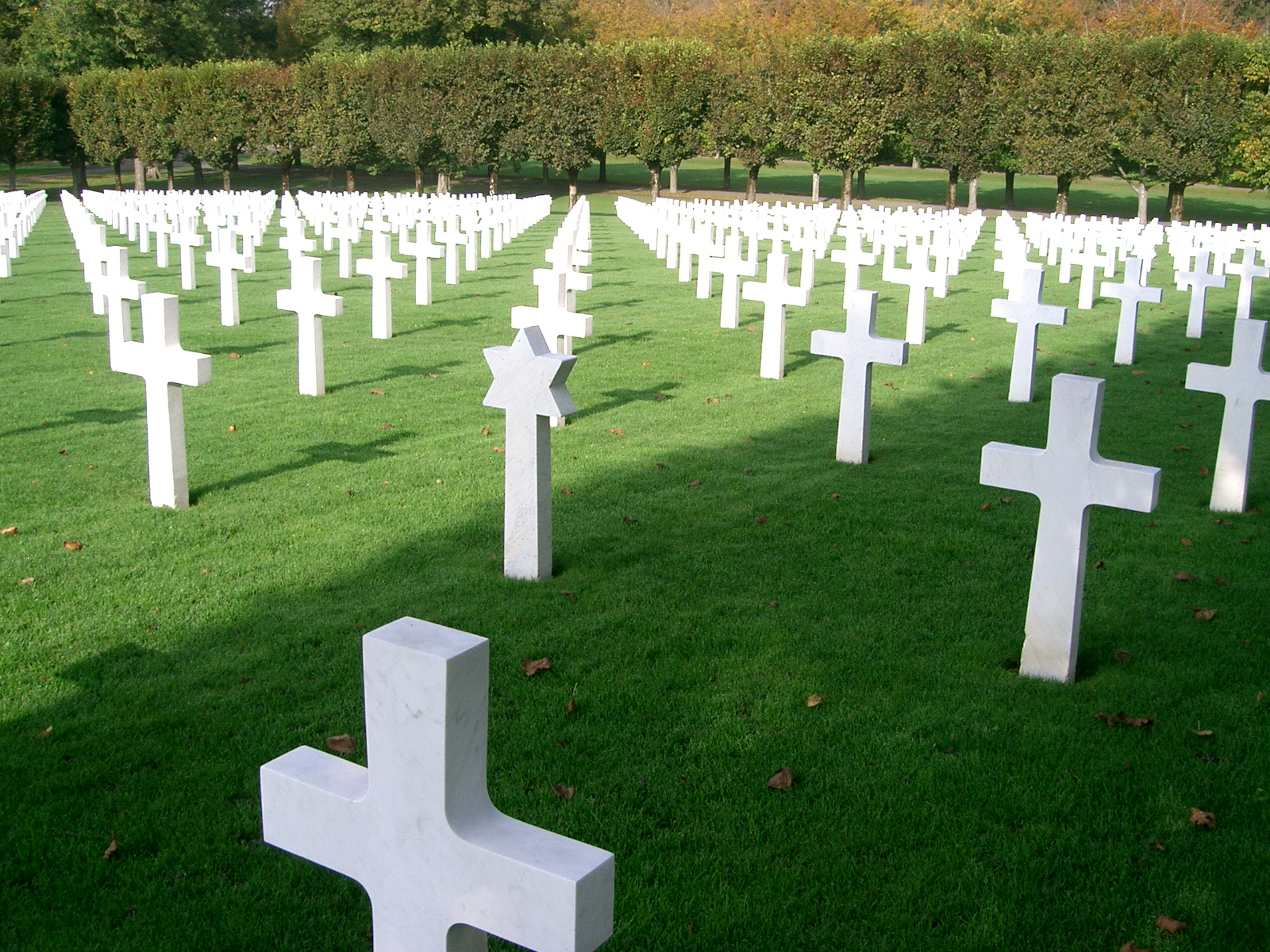
Meuse-Argonne American Cemetery in France, a cemetery for U.S. servicemen killed in Europe during their service in World War I

As World War I raged in Europe from 1914, President Woodrow Wilson declared neutrality, but warned Germany that resumption of unrestricted submarine warfare against American ships would mean war. Germany decided to take the risk, and try to win by cutting off supplies to Britain through the sinking of ships such as the RMS Lusitania. The U.S. declared war in April 1917.

By the summer of 1918 soldiers in General John J. Pershing's American Expeditionary Forces arrived at the rate of 10,000 a day, while Germany was unable to replace its losses. Dissent against the war was suppressed by the Sedition Act of 1918 and Espionage Act of 1917. Over 2,000 were imprisoned for speaking out against the war.

The Allies won in November 1918. Wilson dominated the 1919 Paris Peace Conference, putting his geopolitical hopes in the new League of Nations as Germany was treated harshly in the Treaty of Versailles (1919). Wilson refused to compromise with Senate Republicans over the issue of Congressional power to declare war, and the Senate rejected the Treaty and the League. Instead, the United States chose to pursue unilateralism. The aftershock of Russia's October Revolution resulted in fears of Communism in the United States, leading to a Red Scare and the deportation of non-citizens considered subversive.

Despite the Progressive-era modernization of hospitals and medical schools, the country lost around 550,000 lives to the Spanish flu pandemic in 1918 and 1919. During the "Roaring" 1920s, the economy expanded. African-Americans benefited from the Great Migration and had more cultural power, an example being the Harlem Renaissance which spread jazz music. Meanwhile, the Ku Klux Klan had a resurgence, and the Immigration Act of 1924 was passed to strictly limit the number of new entries.

Prohibition began in 1920, when the manufacture, sale, import and export of alcohol were prohibited by the Eighteenth Amendment. Bootlegged alcohol in the cities ended up under the control of gangs, who fought each other for territory. Italian bootleggers in New York City gradually formed the Mafia crime syndicate. In 1933, President Franklin D. Roosevelt repealed prohibition.

=== Great Depression and the New Deal ===
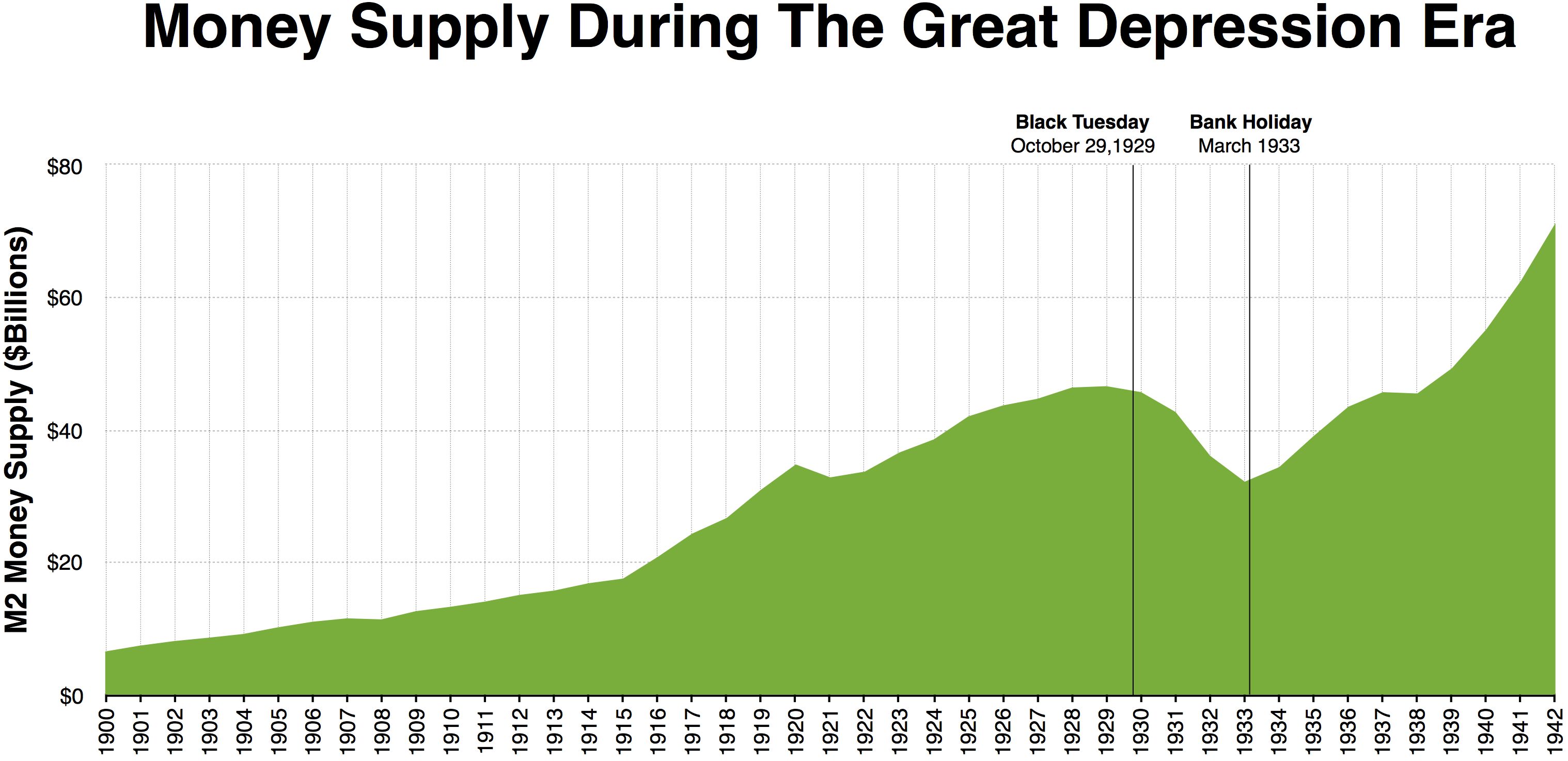
A depiction of the sharp decrease of the money supply between Black Tuesday and the Bank Holiday when massive bank runs commence across the United States in March 1933

The Great Depression (1929–1939) and the New Deal (1933–1936) were decisive moments in American political, economic, and social history. A financial bubble was fueled by an inflated stock market, which led to the Wall Street crash on October 29, 1929. This, along with other economic factors, triggered a worldwide depression. The United States experienced deflation as prices fell, unemployment soared from 3% in 1929 to 25% in 1933, farm prices fell by half, and manufacturing output plunged by one-third.

The New Deal enacted by President Franklin D. Roosevelt was a series of permanent reform programs including Social Security, unemployment relief and insurance, public housing, bankruptcy insurance, farm subsidies, and regulation of financial securities. It also provided unemployment relief through the Works Progress Administration (WPA) and for young men, the Civilian Conservation Corps. Large-scale spending projects designed to rebuild infrastructure were under the purview of the Public Works Administration.

State governments introduced the sales tax to pay for new programs. Ideologically, the New Deal established modern liberalism in the United States. The New Deal coalition won re-election for Roosevelt in 1936, 1940, and 1944. The Second New Deal in 1935 and 1936 brought the economy further left, building up labor unions through the Wagner Act. Roosevelt weakened his second term by a failed effort to pack the Supreme Court, which had been a center of conservative resistance to his programs. The economy essentially recovered by 1936, but long-term unemployment remained a problem until it was solved by wartime spending. Most of the relief programs were dropped in the 1940s, when the conservatives regained power in Congress through the Conservative coalition.

=== World War II ===
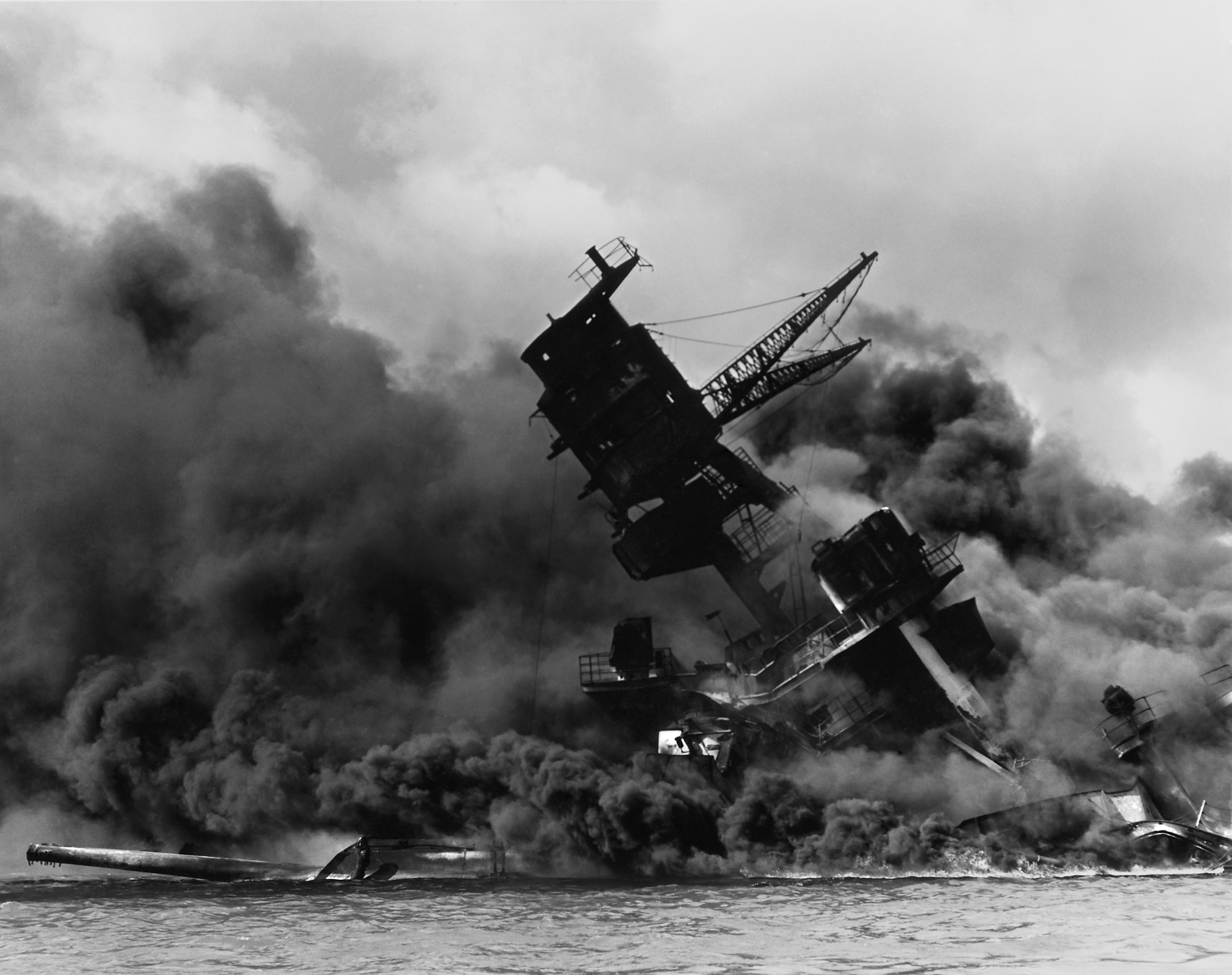
The USS Arizona burning after the Japanese attack on Pearl Harbor on December 7, 1941

During the Depression, the United States remained focused on domestic concerns. U.S. legislation in the Neutrality Acts sought to avoid foreign conflicts; however, policy clashed with increasing anti-Nazi feelings following the German invasion of Poland in September 1939 that started World War II. At first, Roosevelt positioned the U.S. as the "Arsenal of Democracy", pledging full-scale financial and munitions support for the Allies and Lend-Lease agreements – but no military personnel.

Japan tried to neutralize America's power in the Pacific by attacking Pearl Harbor on December 7, 1941, but instead it catalyzed American support to enter the war. The attack ended a 20-year era of American isolationism which began after the end of WW1 and remains, as of 2026, the last period of isolationism for America. Roosevelt's Executive Order 9066 resulted in over 120,000 Americans of Japanese descent being removed from their homes and placed in internment camps. The Allies fought against Germany in the European theater and Japan in the Pacific War. The United States was one of the "Allied Big Four", alongside the United Kingdom, Soviet Union, and China.

The U.S. gave the Allied war effort money, food, petroleum, technology, and military personnel. The U.S. focused on maximizing its national economic output, causing a dramatic increase in GDP, the end of unemployment, and a rise in civilian consumption, even as 40% of the GDP went to the war effort. A wartime production boom led to the end of the Great Depression. Tens of millions of workers moved into the active labor force and to higher-productivity jobs. Labor shortages encouraged industries to look for new sources of workers, finding new roles for women and Black people. Economic mobilization was managed by the War Production Board. Most durable goods became unavailable or were tightly rationed, while housing for industrial jobs was in short supply. Prices and wages were controlled, and Americans saved a high portion of their incomes, which led to post-war growth.

The U.S. stopped Japanese expansion in the Pacific in 1942; after the loss of the Philippines to Japanese conquests, as well as a draw in the Battle of the Coral Sea in May, the American Navy then inflicted a decisive blow at Midway in June 1942. The Allied forces built up a garrison on Guadalcanal island, formerly held by the Japanese, after the successes of the Battle of the Eastern Solomons and the Battle of Guadalcanal. The Japanese then stopped advancing south, and the U.S. began taking New Guinea. Japan also lost their invasion of the Alaskan Aleutian Islands, allowing the U.S. to begin attacking the Japanese-controlled Kuril Islands.

American ground forces assisted in the North African campaign and the collapse of Fascist Italy in 1943. A more significant European front was opened on D-Day, June 6, 1944, in which Allied forces invaded Nazi-occupied France. The Allies began pushing the Germans out of France in the Normandy campaign. After Allied forces landed at the French Riviera in Operation Dragoon, Hitler allowed his army to retreat from Normandy. Roosevelt died in 1945, and was succeeded by Harry Truman. The western front stopped short of Berlin, leaving the Soviets to take it in the Battle of Berlin. The Nazi regime formally capitulated in May 1945, ending the war in Europe.

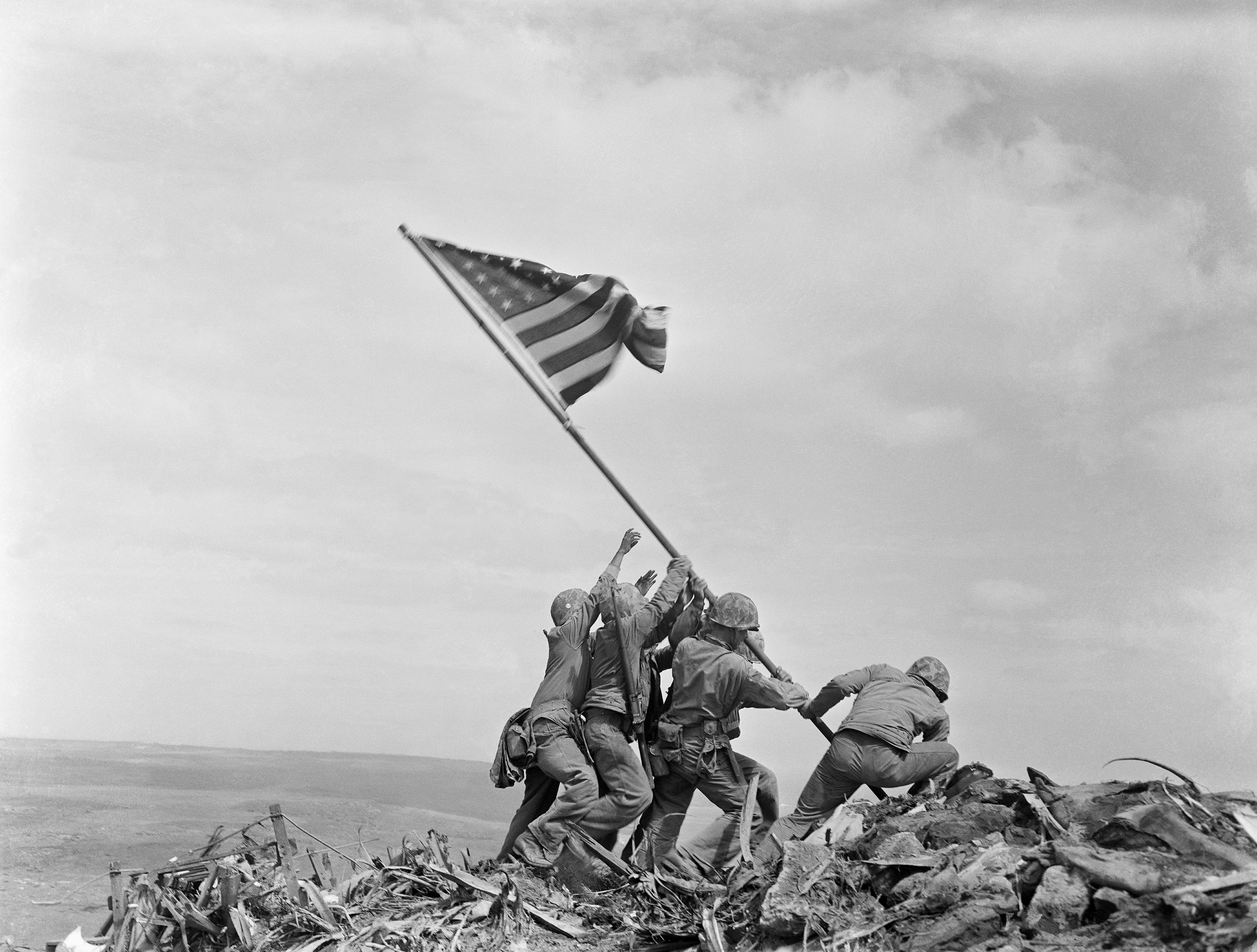
Raising the Flag on Iwo Jima, a photo of U.S. Marines raising a U.S. flag atop Mount Suribachi during the Battle of Iwo Jima on February 23, 1945

In the Pacific, the U.S. implemented an island hopping strategy toward Tokyo. The Philippines was eventually reconquered, after Japan and the United States fought in history's largest naval battle, the Battle of Leyte Gulf. After the war, the U.S. granted the Philippines independence.

Military research and development increased during the war, leading to the Manhattan Project, a secret effort to harness nuclear fission to produce atomic bombs; the first nuclear device was detonated on July 16, 1945. U.S. airfields in the Mariana Islands allowed for easier bombing of Japan and hard-fought U.S. victories at Iwo Jima and Okinawa in 1945. The U.S. initially prepared to invade Japan's home islands, but they dropped atomic bombs on the Japanese cities of Hiroshima and Nagasaki in August 1945, killing at least 200,000 residents in both cities, compelling Japan to surrender and ending World War II. The U.S. occupied Japan (and part of Germany). Throughout the 4 years of American involvement in World War II, 400,000 American military personnel and civilians were killed. Nuclear weapons have not been used since the war ended, and a "Long Peace" began between the global powers, but they still competed in the Cold War.

== Cold War (1945–1991) ==
The NATO (blue) and Warsaw Pact (red) alliances during the Cold War from 1949 to 1990

=== Economic boom and the beginning of the Cold War ===
==== Truman administration ====
In the decades after World War II, the United States became a global influence in economic, political, military, cultural, and technological affairs. Following World War II, the United States emerged as one of the two dominant superpowers, the Soviet Union being the other. The U.S. Senate approved U.S. participation in the United Nations (UN), which marked a turn away from traditional American isolationism and toward increased international involvement. The United States and other major Allied powers became the foundation of the UN Security Council. The Central Intelligence Agency (CIA) was created in 1947.

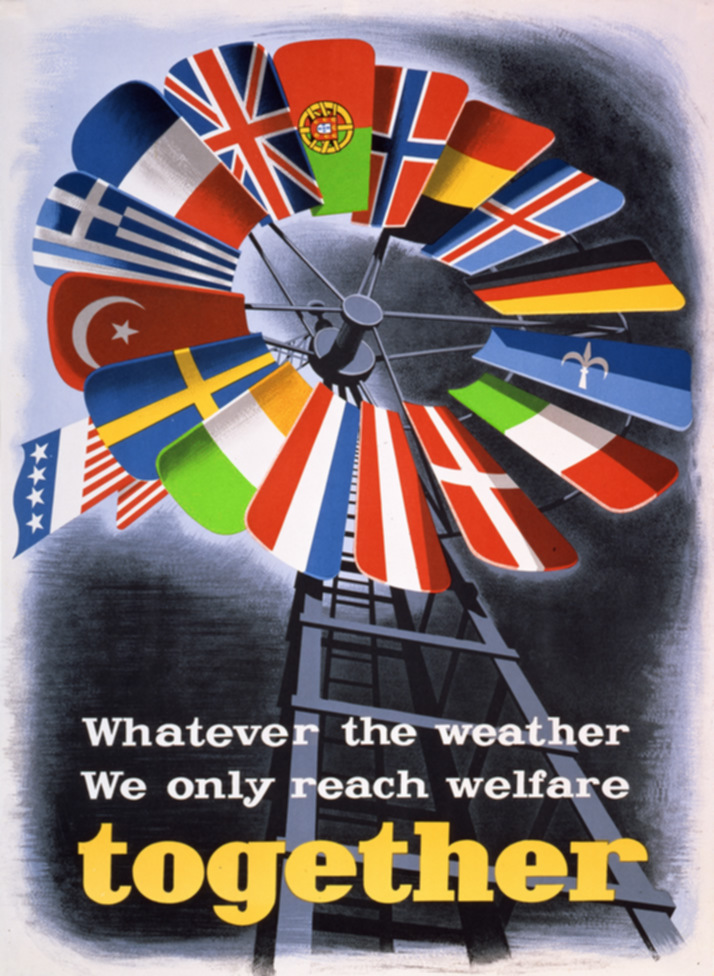
One of a number of posters created by the Economic Cooperation Administration, an agency of the U.S. government, to sell the Marshall Plan in Europe following the end of World War II

The U.S. wished to rescue Europe from the devastation of World War II, and to contain the expansion of communism, represented by the Soviet Union. U.S. foreign policy during the Cold War was built around the support of Western Europe and Japan along with the policy of containment (containing the spread of communism). The Truman Doctrine in 1947 was the U.S.' attempt to secure trading partners in Europe, by providing military and economic aid to Greece and Turkey to counteract the threat of communist expansion in the Balkans. In 1948, the United States replaced piecemeal financial aid programs with a comprehensive Marshall Plan, which pumped money into Western Europe, and removed trade barriers, while modernizing the managerial practices of businesses and governments. Post-war American aid to Europe totaled $25 billion, out of the U.S. GDP of $258 billion in 1948.

In 1949, the United States, rejecting the long-standing policy of no military alliances in peacetime, formed the North Atlantic Treaty Organization (NATO) alliance. In response, the Soviets formed the Warsaw Pact of communist states, leading to the "Iron Curtain". In 1949, the Soviets performed their first nuclear weapon test. This escalated the risk of nuclear warfare; the threat of mutually assured destruction, however, prevented both powers from nuclear war, and resulted the proxy wars in which the two sides did not directly confront each other.

The U.S. fought against communists in the Korean War and Vietnam War, and toppled left-wing governments in the third world to try to stop its spread, such as Iran in 1953 and Guatemala in 1954. McCarthyism was a widespread government program led by Senator Joseph McCarthy to expose communists in government and business. Hollywood was targeted by the House Un-American Activities Committee. Gay people were targeted under the McCarthyist Lavender Scare.

==== Eisenhower administration ====
Dwight D. Eisenhower was elected president in 1952 in a landslide. He ended the Korean War, and avoided any other major conflict. He cut military spending by relying on advanced technology, such as nuclear weapons carried by long-range bombers and intercontinental missiles. After Stalin died in 1953, Eisenhower worked to obtain friendlier relationships with the Soviet Union. At home, he ended McCarthyism, expanded the Social Security program, and presided over a decade of bipartisan cooperation.

Domestically, after 1948, America entered an economic boom: 60% of the American population had attained a "middle-class" standard of living by the mid-1950s, compared with only 31% in the 1928 and 1929. Between 1947 and 1960, the average real income for American workers increased by as much as it had in the previous half-century. The economy allowed for an affordable lifestyle with large families; this created the baby boom, in which millions of children were born at increased rates from 1945 to 1964. Many Americans moved into suburban neighborhoods.

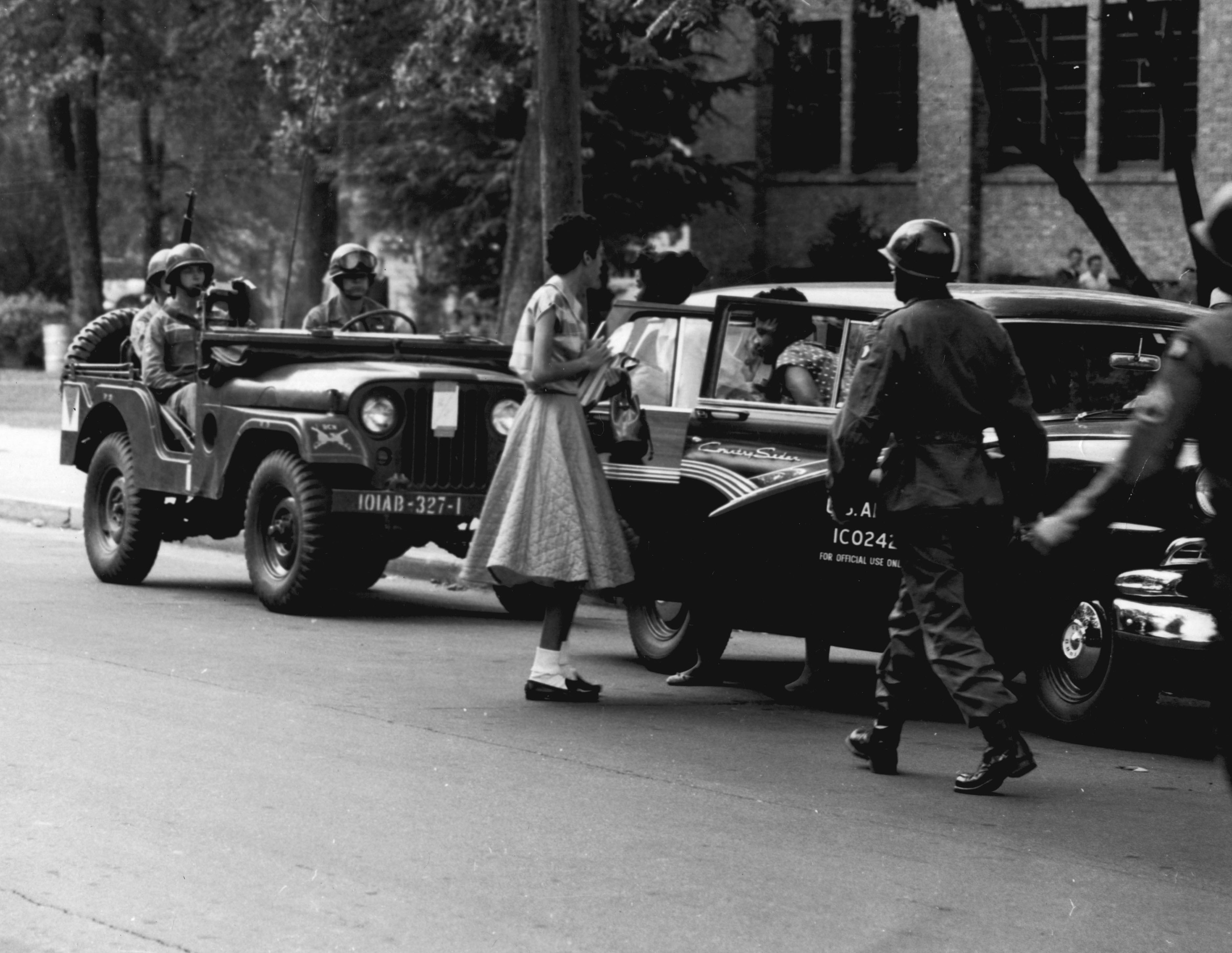
The 101st Airborne Division escorting the Little Rock Nine into Little Rock Central High School in September 1957

In 1954, the Supreme Court ruled on Brown v. Board of Education, finding public school segregation unconstitutional. When nine Black students were threatened over their admission into all-white Little Rock Central High School, Eisenhower sent in a thousand National Guard troops to ensure peace. Starting in the late 1950s, institutionalized racism across the United States, but especially in the South, was increasingly challenged by the growing civil rights movement. The activism of Rosa Parks and Martin Luther King Jr. led to the boycott of segregated public buses in Montgomery, Alabama in 1955, organized by King and the Montgomery Improvement Association. They faced multiple acts of violence, but continued the boycott for a year, until the Supreme Court ordered the city to desegregate the buses.

The Soviets unexpectedly surpassed American technology in 1957 with Sputnik, the first Earth satellite. The R-7 missile which launched Sputnik into space could have hypothetically dropped a nuclear bomb into U.S. air space from above; new American fears regarding Soviet power began the Space Race, a competition between the two countries to prove their technological superiority through space exploration. In 1958, Eisenhower created the National Aeronautics and Space Administration (NASA) for this purpose. Angst about the weaknesses of American education led to large-scale federal support for science education and research.

=== Civil unrest and social reforms ===
In 1960, John F. Kennedy was elected President. His administration saw the acceleration of the country's role in the Space Race, escalation of the American role in the Vietnam War, the Bay of Pigs Invasion, and the Cuban Missile Crisis. President Kennedy was assassinated on November 22, 1963. Lyndon B. Johnson then became president. He secured congressional passage of his Great Society programs, dealing with civil rights, the end of legal segregation, Medicare, extension of welfare, federal aid to education at all levels, subsidies for the arts and humanities, environmental activism, and a series of programs designed to wipe out poverty.

==== Civil rights and counterculture movements ====
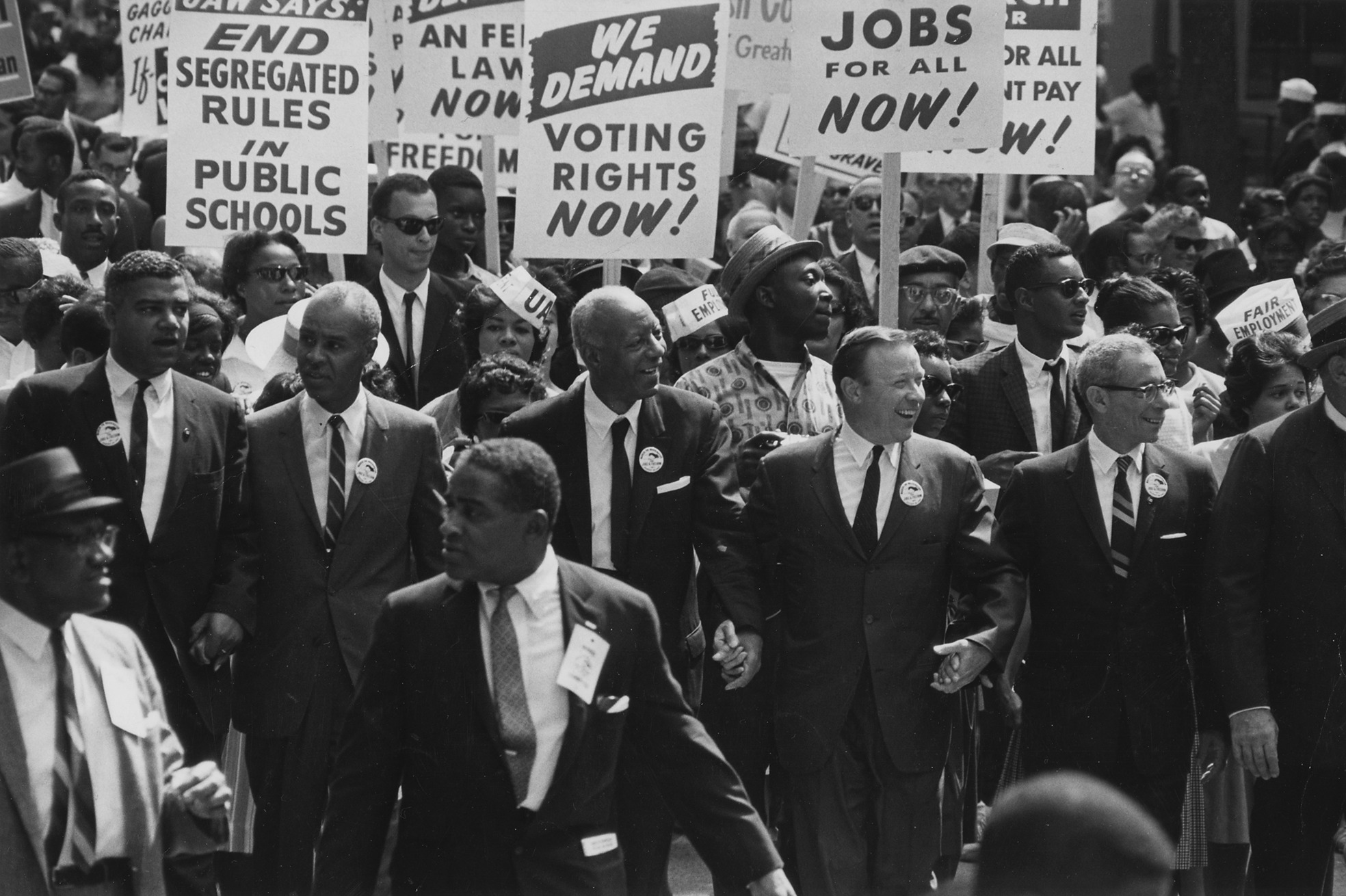
Civil rights activists during the March on Washington for Jobs and Freedom in Washington, D.C. in August 1963

For years, nonviolent civil rights activists organized direct actions, such as the 1963 Birmingham campaign, the 1965 Selma to Montgomery march, and the 1966 Chicago open housing movement, where they also became victims of violence. Along with Supreme Court decisions like Loving v. Virginia and the 1963 March on Washington, these movements achieved great steps toward equality with laws like the Civil Rights Act of 1964, the Voting Rights Act of 1965, and the Fair Housing Act of 1968. These ended the Jim Crow laws that had legalized racial segregation. Native Americans protested federal courts, highlighting the federal government's failure to honor treaties involving them. One of the most outspoken Native American groups was the American Indian Movement (AIM). In the 1960s, Cesar Chavez began organizing poorly paid Mexican-American farm workers in California, eventually forming the country's first successful union of farm workers, the United Farm Workers of America (UFW).

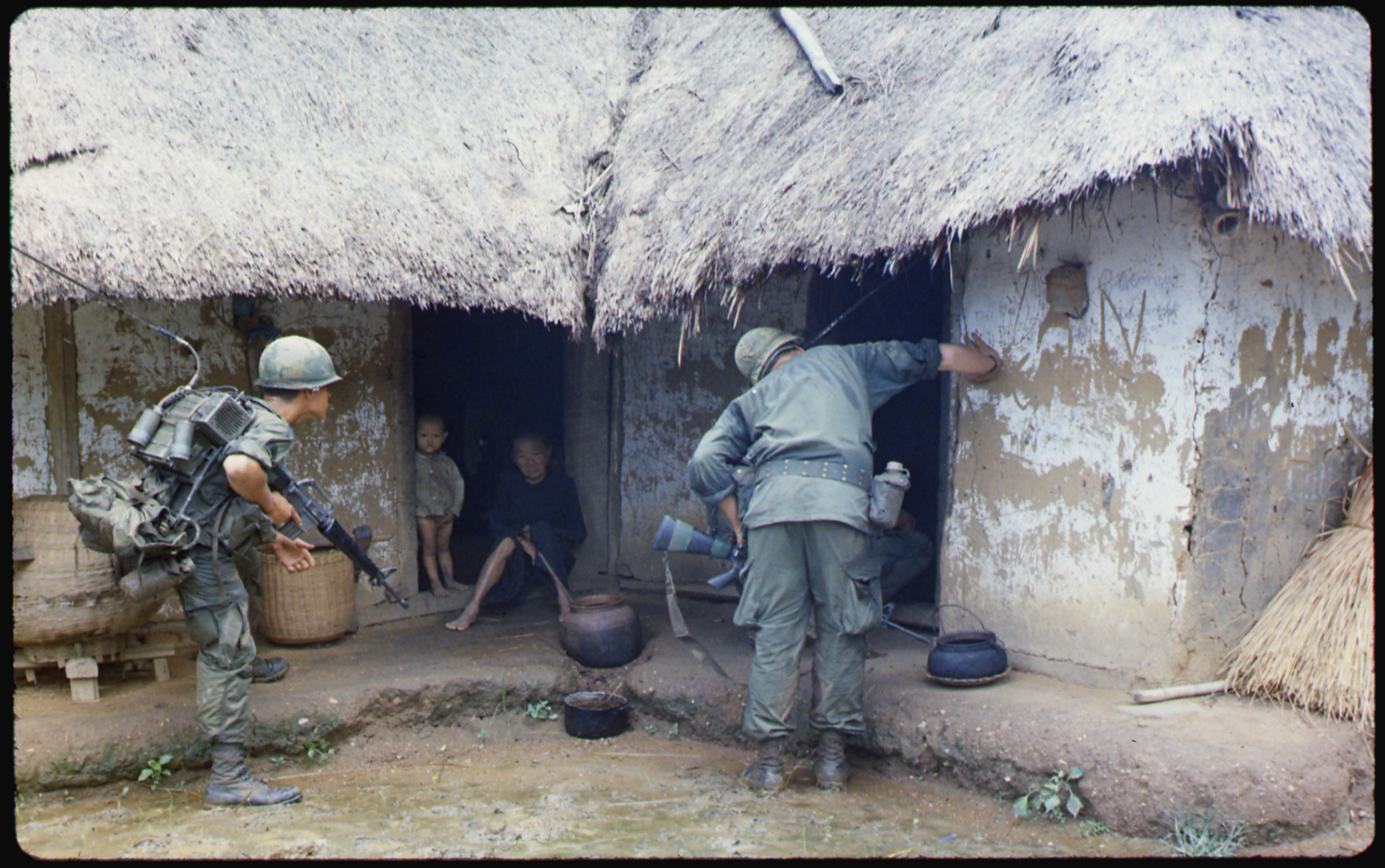
U.S. soldiers searching a village for potential Viet Cong during the Vietnam War in October 1966

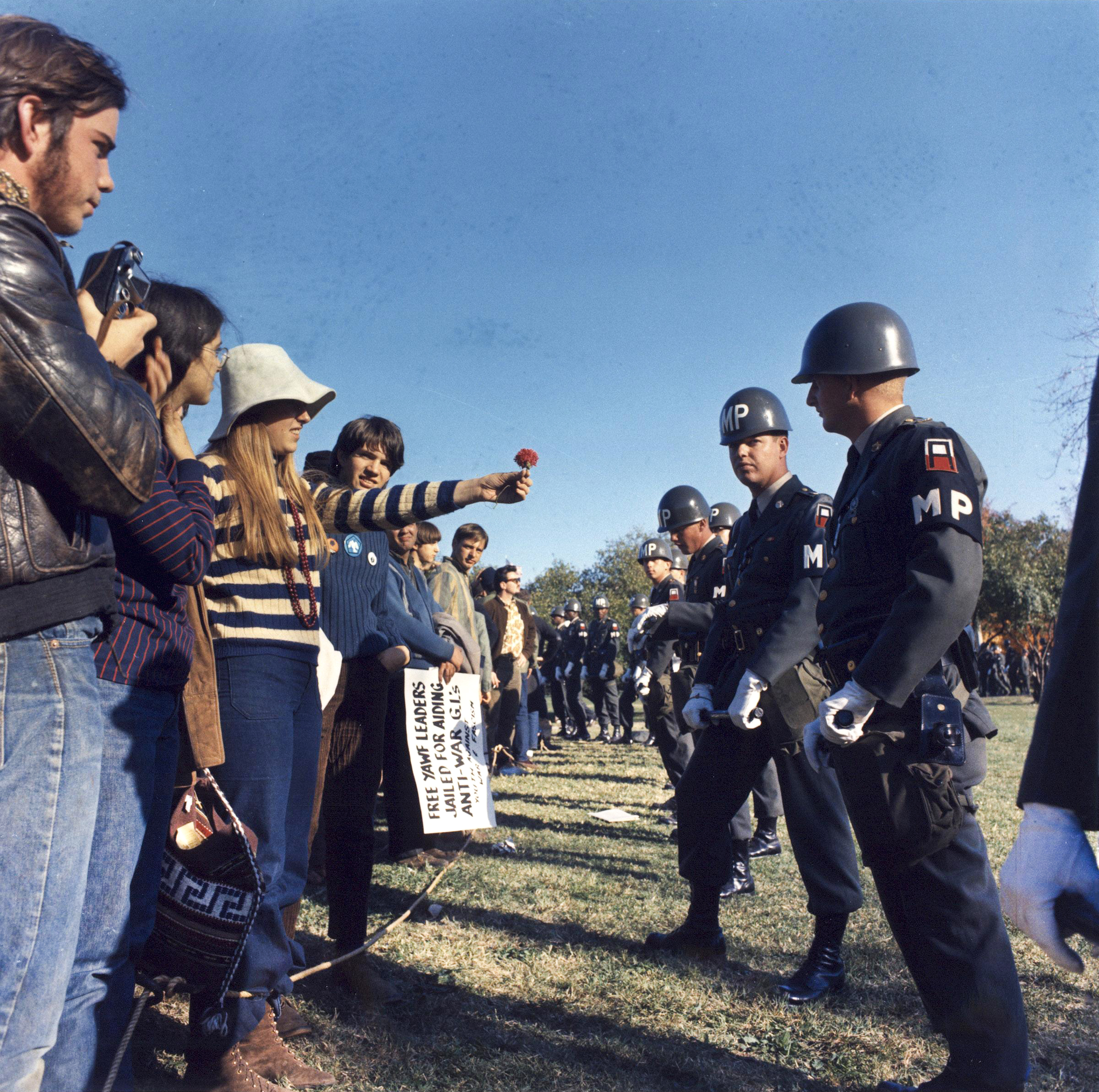
Demonstrators at the March on the Pentagon, an anti-Vietnam War demonstration outside the Pentagon in October 1967

Amid the Cold War, the United States entered the Vietnam War, whose growing unpopularity fed already existing social movements. Feminism and the environmental movement became political forces, and progress continued toward civil rights for all Americans. A counterculture revolution in the late sixties and early seventies further divided Americans in a "culture war" but also brought forth more liberated social views. Frustrations with the seemingly slow progress of the integration movement led to the emergence of more radical politics, such as the Black Power movement. The summer of 1967 saw opposing philosophies in two widespread movements, the more peaceful Summer of Love and the radical long, hot summer, which included nationwide riots. Martin Luther King Jr. was assassinated in 1968. The modern gay rights movement started after the Stonewall riots in 1969.

A new consciousness of the inequality of American women began sweeping the nation, starting with the 1963 publication of Betty Friedan's best-seller, The Feminine Mystique, which critiqued the American cultural idea that women could only find fulfillment through their roles as wives, mothers, and keepers of the home. In 1966, Friedan and others established the National Organization for Women (NOW) to advocate for women's rights. Protests began, and the new women's liberation movement grew in size and power, gaining much media attention. The proposed Equal Rights Amendment to the Constitution, passed by Congress in 1972, was defeated by a conservative coalition mobilized by Phyllis Schlafly. However, many federal laws established women's equal status under the law, such as those equalizing pay, employment, education, employment opportunities, and credit between genders, and ending pregnancy discrimination. State laws criminalized spousal abuse and marital rape, and the Supreme Court ruled that the equal protection clause of the Fourteenth Amendment applied to women. Social custom and consciousness began to change, accepting women's equality. Abortion, deemed by the Supreme Court as a fundamental right in Roe v. Wade (1973), is still a point of debate.

=== Détente ===
Détente is the easing of tense, charged relations, especially in a political situation. The term is often used in reference to the general easing of relations between the Soviet Union and the United States in the 1970s, a thaw at a time almost in the midst of the Cold War.

==== Nixon and Ford administrations ====
Buzz Aldrin (shown) and Neil Armstrong became the first humans to walk on the Moon during NASA's Apollo 11 mission in July 1969.

President Richard Nixon (1969–1974) largely continued the New Deal and Great Society programs he inherited. Nixon created the Environmental Protection Agency, opened relations with China, and attempted to gradually turn the Vietnam War effort over to the South Vietnamese. He negotiated the peace treaty in 1973 which secured the release of POWs and led to the withdrawal of U.S. troops. The war had cost the lives of 58,000 American troops. Nixon manipulated the fierce distrust between the Soviet Union and China to the advantage of the U.S., achieving détente with both parties. He was also president during the U.S.' landing on the Moon in 1969.

The Watergate scandal, involving Nixon's cover-up of his operatives' break-in into the Democratic National Committee headquarters, destroyed his political base and forced his resignation on August 9, 1974. He was succeeded by Vice President Gerald Ford.

The Fall of Saigon on April 30, 1975, ended the Vietnam War. In Central America, the U.S. government supported right-wing governments against left-wing groups, such as in El Salvador and Guatemala. In South America, they supported Argentina and Chile, who carried out Operation Condor, a campaign of assassinations of exiled political opponents by Southern Cone governments, created at the behest of Chilean dictator Augusto Pinochet in 1975.

The OPEC oil embargo marked a long-term economic transition: energy prices skyrocketed, and American factories faced serious competition from foreign automobiles, clothing, electronics, and consumer goods. By the late 1970s, the economy suffered an energy crisis, slow economic growth, high unemployment, very high inflation, and high interest rates (stagflation). Since economists agreed on deregulation, many of the New Deal era regulations were ended. Meanwhile, the first mass-market personal computers were being developed in California's Silicon Valley.

==== Iran hostage crisis and 1980 election ====
Jimmy Carter was elected president in 1976. Carter brokered the Camp David Accords between Israel and Egypt. In 1979, Iranian students stormed the U.S. embassy in Tehran and took 66 Americans hostage. Carter lost the 1980 election to the Republican Ronald Reagan. On January 20, 1981, minutes after Carter's term ended, the remaining U.S. captives were released.

=== End of the Cold War ===
After a revolutionary wave overthrowing most communist states in Europe happened in 1989, Gorbachev and President Bush Sr. met on the neutral island of Malta to discuss the events of the year, the withdrawal of the Soviet military from Eastern Europe, and the future course of their relationship. After their discussions, the two leaders publicly announced they would work together for German reunification, the normalization of relations, the resolution of Third World conflicts, and the promotion of peace and democracy (referred to by President Bush as a "New World Order")

Mikhail Gorbachev introduced political and economic reforms. Economic strain and regional independence movements led to the official dissolution of the Soviet Union on December 26, 1991.

==== Reagan administration ====
Monthly unemployment, inflation, and interest rates from January 1981 to January 1989

President Ronald Reagan's conservative policies produced a major political realignment with his 1980 landslide election. Reagan was wounded but survived a 1981 assassination attempt. His neoliberal economic policies (dubbed "Reaganomics") included the implementation of the Economic Recovery Tax Act of 1981. Reagan continued to downsize government taxation and regulation; New Deal and Great Society programs were ended. The U.S. experienced a recession in 1982, but after inflation decreased, unemployment then decreased, and the economic growth rate increased from 4.5% in 1982 to 7.2% in 1984. However, homelessness and economic inequality also rose.

Reagan ordered a buildup of the U.S. military, incurring additional budget deficits. The 1983 invasion of Grenada and 1986 bombing of Libya were popular in the U.S., though Reagan's backing of the Contra rebels was mired in the controversy over the Iran–Contra affair. Reagan also introduced a complicated missile defense system known as the Strategic Defense Initiative. In 1983, he provided the clearest enunciation of his foreign policy intentions during the midst of the Soviet-Afghan War, he declared the Soviet Union to be an Evil Empire. Three Soviet premiers died during Reagan's presidency, and it was with Gorbachev that the vast majority of arms control and other negotiations took place. Reagan met four times with Gorbachev, and their summit conferences led to the signing of the Intermediate-Range Nuclear Forces Treaty.

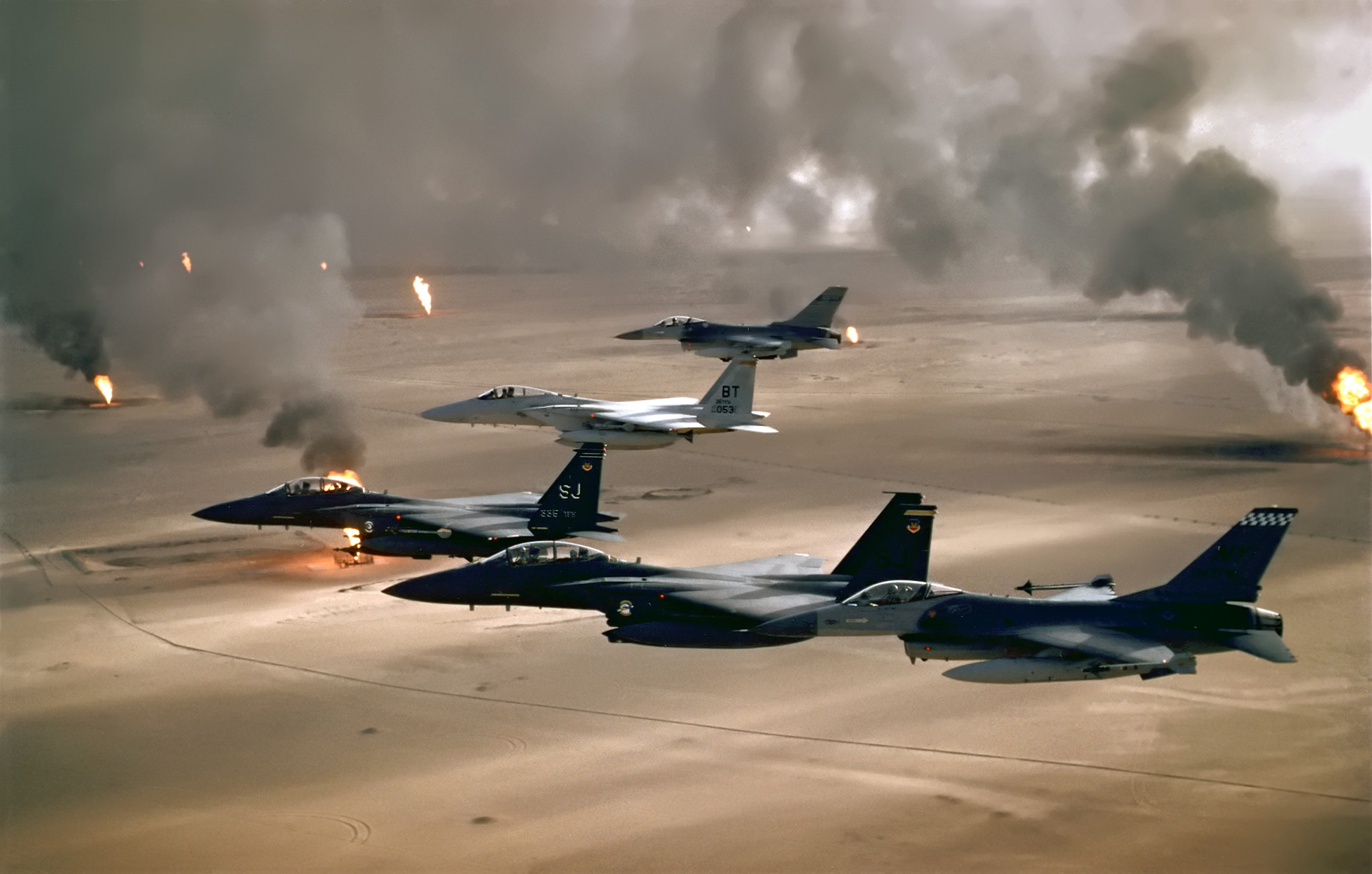
U.S. Air Force aircraft fly over oil fields destroyed by the retreating Iraqi Ground Forces during the Gulf War in 1991

==== Post-Cold War era ====
International affairs drove the George H. W. Bush presidency, which navigated the end of the Cold War and a new era of U.S.–Soviet relations. In 1989 Bush directed a military invasion of Panama to overthrow Manuel Noriega. On December 3, 1989, Gorbachev and Bush declared the Cold War over at the Malta Summit. After the fall of the Berlin Wall, Bush successfully pushed for the reunification of Germany in close cooperation with West German Chancellor Helmut Kohl, overcoming the reluctance of Gorbachev. The Soviet Union collapsed in 1991, leaving the United States as the sole superpower.

== Contemporary United States (1991–present) ==
=== George H. W. Bush and Clinton administrations ===
After the collapse of the Soviet Union, the United States continued to intervene in international affairs. George H. W. Bush's administration led an international coalition against Iraq in the Gulf War after Iraq invaded neighboring Kuwait in 1990. The war undid the Iraqi annexation of Kuwait. Under Bush, the U.S. also became involved in wars in Panama, Somalia, Bosnia, and Croatia. In 1992, there were riots in Los Angeles over police brutality.

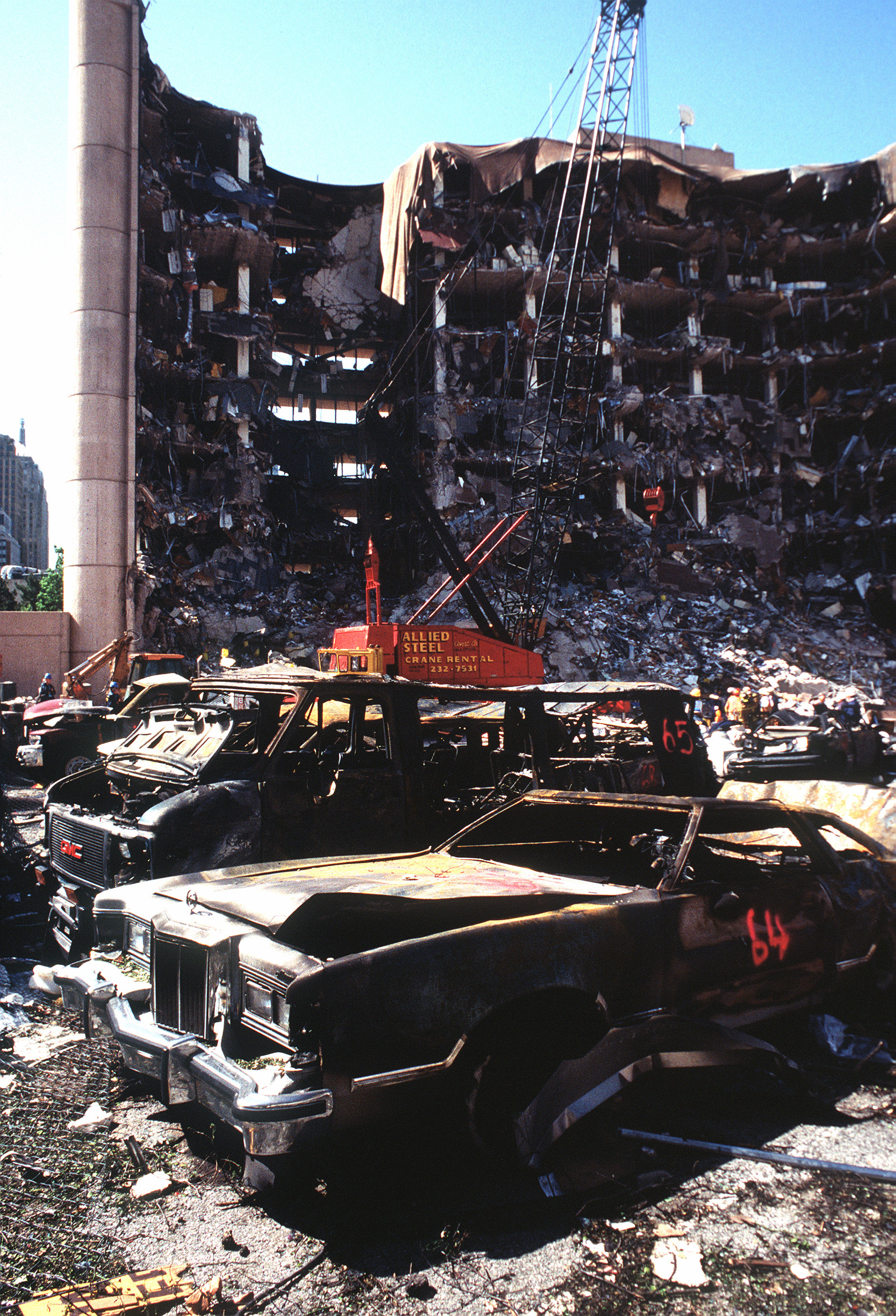
Ruins following the Oklahoma City bombing in April 1995

Elected in 1992, President Bill Clinton oversaw economic expansion and passed the first balanced federal budget in 30 years. Much of the economic boom was a side effect of the Digital Revolution, and new business opportunities created by the Internet. During the Clinton administration, the U.S. was involved in wars in Haiti and Kosovo.

Conservative Republicans heavily won the 1994 midterm elections in a "Republican Revolution", which was built around the Contract with America policy agenda. Newt Gingrich was chosen as House Speaker, and he would heavily influence the Republican Party to engage in "confrontational" political speech. Clinton's leadership after the Oklahoma City bombing increased his popularity, and he won in the 1996 presidential elections. In 1998, Clinton was impeached by the House of Representatives on charges of lying under oath about a sexual relationship with White House intern Monica Lewinsky. He was acquitted by the Senate.

In 2000, the dot-com bubble, a widespread overvaluation of Internet company stocks, burst and hurt the U.S. economy. The presidential election in 2000 between Governor George W. Bush and Al Gore was extremely close and produced a dramatic dispute over the counting of votes. Bush ultimately won after a Supreme Court ruling.

=== War on terror and Great Recession ===
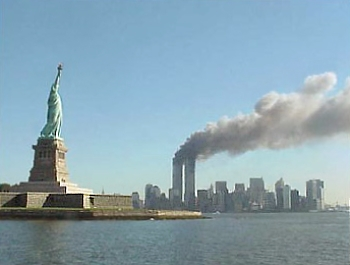
September 11 attacks in New York City: View of the World Trade Center and the Statue of Liberty. (Image: US National Park Service)

In the September 11 attacks on September 11, 2001, 19 al-Qaeda hijackers commandeered four commercial planes to be used in suicide attacks. Two were crashed intentionally into both Twin Towers of the World Trade Center in New York City, and a third into the Pentagon in Arlington County, Virginia. The fourth plane was retaken by the passengers and crew and crashed into an empty field in Pennsylvania. Every building of the World Trade Center partially or completely collapsed, massively damaging the surrounding area and blanketing Lower Manhattan in toxic dust clouds. 2,977 victims died in the attacks, which proved the deadliest terrorist attack in world history.

On September 20, Bush announced a "war on terror". In October 2001, the U.S. and NATO invaded Afghanistan and ousted the Taliban regime, which had harbored al-Qaeda and its leader Osama bin Laden. Bin Laden escaped to Pakistan, starting a manhunt. The U.S. established new domestic efforts to prevent future attacks. The Patriot Act increased the power of government to monitor communications and removed legal restrictions on intelligence sharing between federal law enforcement agencies. The government's indefinite detention of terrorism suspects captured abroad at the Guantanamo Bay detention camp led to allegations of human rights abuses and violations of international law. The Department of Homeland Security was created to lead federal counter-terrorism activities.

In March 2003, the U.S. launched an invasion of Iraq, claiming Iraqi dictator Saddam Hussein had weapons of mass destruction (WMDs). Intelligence backing WMDs were later found to be inaccurate. The war led to the collapse of the Iraqi government and the eventual capture of Hussein. The Iraq War fueled international protests and gradually saw domestic support decline.

In 2005, Hurricane Katrina killed 1,800 people around New Orleans after the city's levees broke. In 2007, after years of violence by the Iraqi insurgency, Bush deployed more troops in a strategy dubbed "the surge". While the death toll decreased, the political stability of Iraq remained in doubt. In 2008, the U.S. entered the Great Recession. Multiple overlapping crises were involved, especially the housing market crisis, a subprime mortgage crisis, soaring oil prices, an automotive industry crisis, rising unemployment, and the 2008 financial crisis, the worst financial crisis since the Great Depression. The bankruptcy of Lehman Brothers threatened the stability of the entire economy in September 2008. Starting in October, the federal government lent $245 billion to financial institutions through the bipartisan Troubled Asset Relief Program.

=== Obama administration ===
Barack Obama delivering his 2009 inauguration address

Barack Obama, the first multiracial and African American president, was elected in 2008. He signed the Don't Ask, Don't Tell Repeal Act, which allowed people to serve in the military while openly gay. To help the economy, he signed the American Recovery and Reinvestment Act of 2009, Consumer Assistance to Recycle and Save Act, the Patient Protection and Affordable Care Act, informally called "Obamacare", and the Dodd–Frank Wall Street Reform and Consumer Protection Act. The recession officially ended in mid-2009. The economic expansion that followed the Great Recession was the longest in U.S. history; the unemployment rate reached a 50-year low in 2019.

In 2009, Obama issued an executive order banning the use of torture. He ordered the closure of secret CIA-run prisons overseas. American military personnel left Iraq in 2011. Meanwhile, Obama increased involvement in Afghanistan, adding 30,000 troops, while proposing to begin withdrawal in 2014. The U.S., with NATO, intervened in the Libyan Civil War in 2011. In May 2011, Osama bin Laden was killed in Pakistan. In October, Obama sent troops to Central Africa to fight the Lord's Resistance Army.

In 2013, the U.S. also started a counter-terrorist intervention in Niger, and began a covert operation to train rebels in Syria who were fighting against the terrorist group ISIS. The latter program was publicized and expanded in 2014. That year, ISIS grew in scope in the Middle East, and inspired many terrorist attacks in the United States, including the 2015 San Bernardino attack. The U.S. and its allies began a significant military offensive against ISIS in Iraq which lasted from 2014 to 2021.

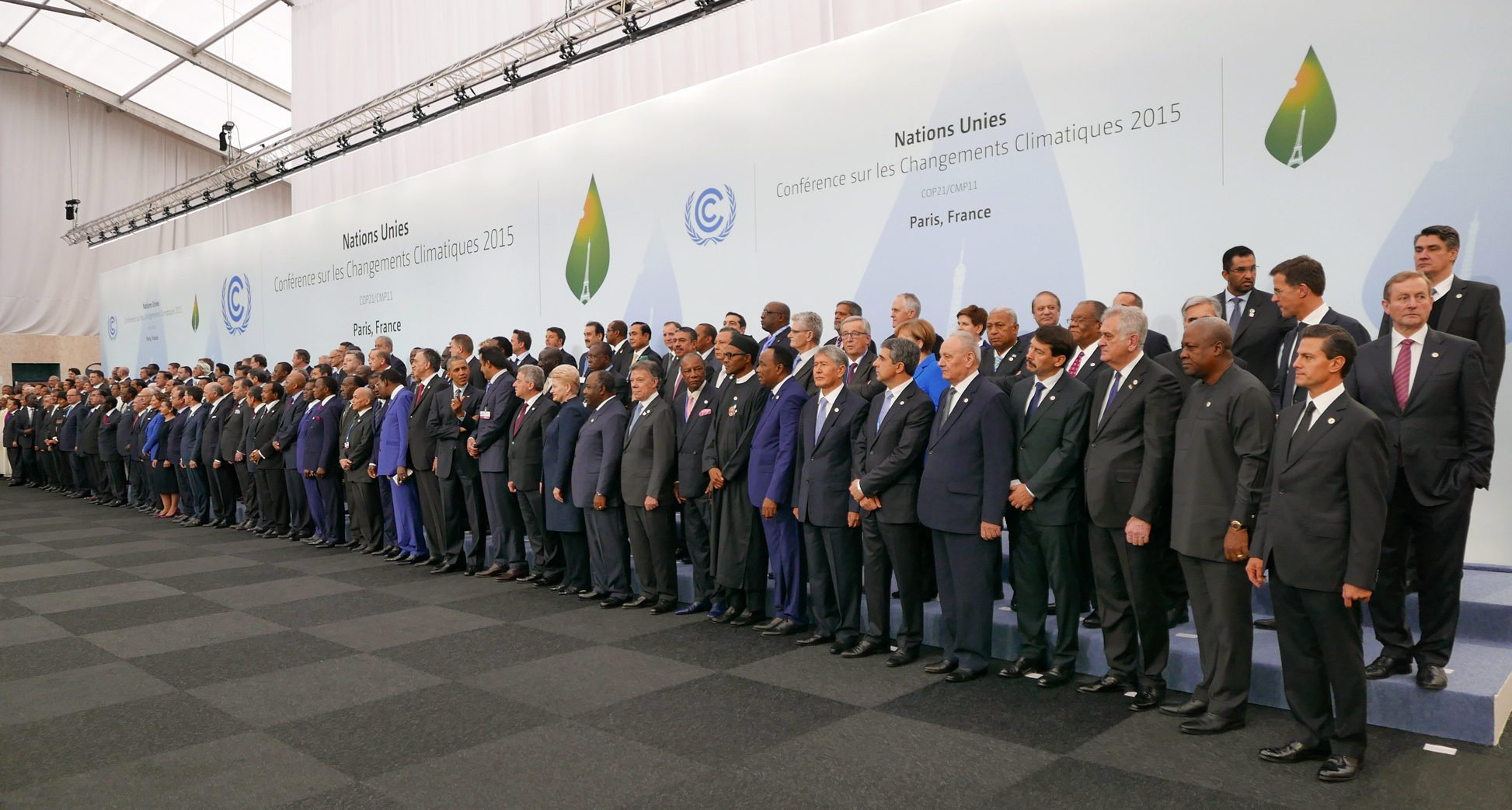
Heads of delegations at the 2015 United Nations Climate Change Conference (COP21), which led to the signing of the Paris Agreement.

In 2012, President Obama became the first president to openly support same-sex marriage. The Supreme Court provided federal recognition of same-sex marriages in 2013, and then legalized gay marriage nationwide with Obergefell v. Hodges in 2015. Also in 2015, the U.S. joined the international Paris Agreement on climate change.

=== First Trump administration ===
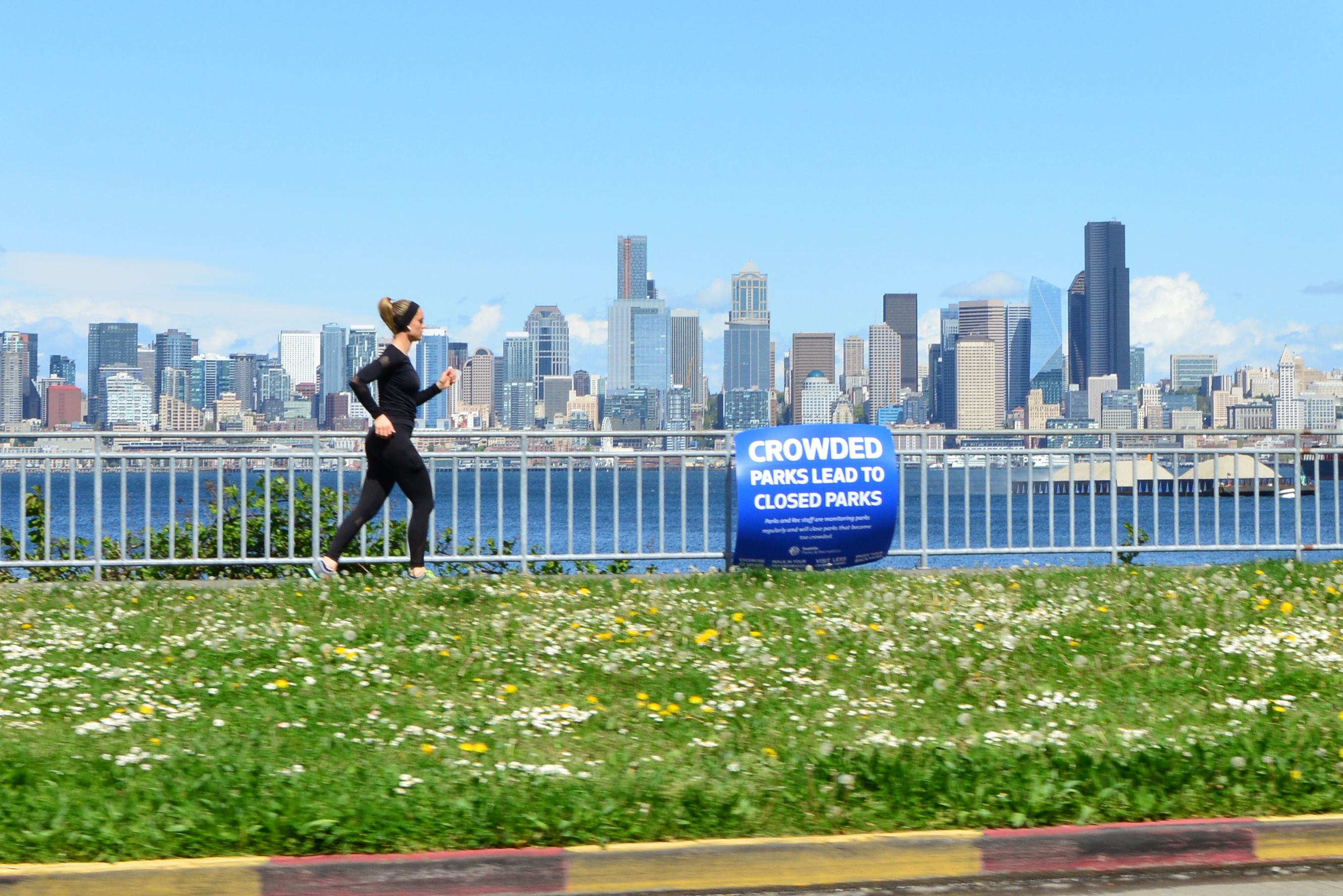
A sign emphasizing social distancing displayed in a park in Seattle, Washington during the COVID-19 pandemic

After decades of testing the political waters, punctuated by events like espousing the Birther Movement, Obama's scathing response at the 2011 White House Correspondents' Dinner, and endorsing Mitt Romney in 2012, Donald Trump became the Republican Party nominee and won the 2016 election in an upset victory over Hillary Clinton. The election's legitimacy was disputed when the FBI and Congress investigated if Russia interfered in the election to help Trump win. There were also accusations of collusion between Trump's campaign and Russian officials. The Mueller report concluded that Russia attempted to help Trump's campaign, but there was no evidence of "explicit" collusion.

During Trump's presidency, he espoused an "America First" ideology, placing restrictions on asylum seekers, expanding the wall on the U.S.-Mexico border, and banning immigration from seven Muslim-majority countries. Many of his actions were challenged in court. He confirmed three new Supreme Court justices (cementing a conservative majority), started a trade war with China, signed the Tax Cuts and Jobs Act, and removed the U.S. from the Paris Agreement. In 2017, the administration issued Space Policy Directive 1 establishing the Artemis program, a space program looking to surpass the accomplishments of the Apollo program through a permanent base on the Moon, and in 2019 created the Space Force. A whistleblower complaint alleged that Trump had withheld foreign aid from Ukraine under the demand that they investigate the business dealings of Hunter Biden; Hunter's father, Democrat Joe Biden, would be Trump's opponent in the 2020 presidential election. Trump was impeached for abuse of power and obstruction of congress, but was acquitted in 2020.

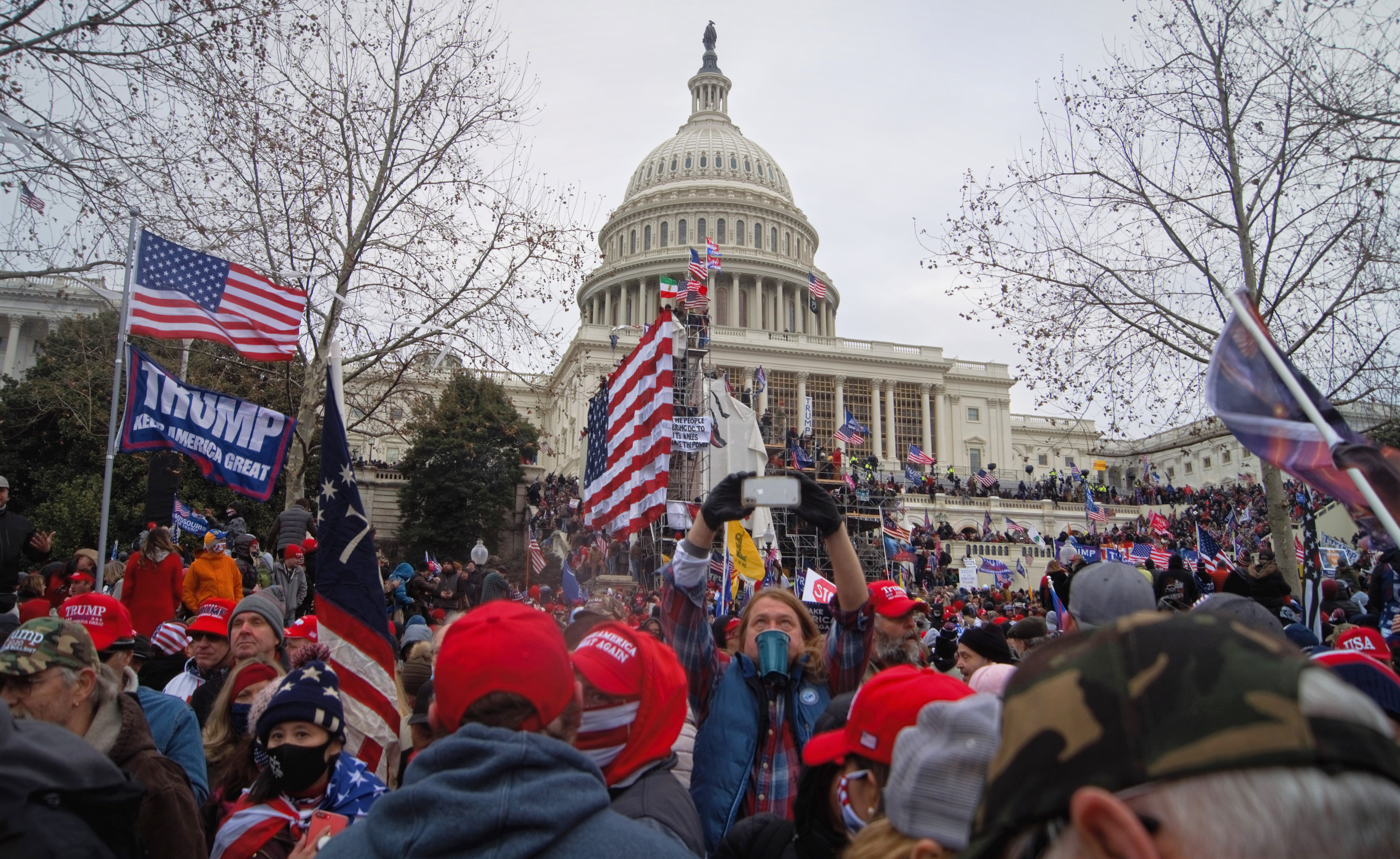
Supporters of then-President Trump attempting to stop the counting of electoral votes on January 6, 2021

Joe Biden defeated Trump in the 2020 presidential election. Trump repeatedly made false claims of massive voter fraud and election rigging, leading to the January 6 United States Capitol attack by supporters of Trump and right-wing militias. The attack was widely described as a coup d'état. It led to Trump's impeachment for incitement of insurrection, making him the only U.S. president to be impeached twice. The Senate later acquitted Trump, despite some fellow Republicans voting against him. Kamala Harris was inaugurated as the first Black, Asian, and female vice president.

=== Covid-19 Pandemic ===
COVID-19 started spreading in China in 2019. In March 2020, the WHO declared a pandemic. American state and local governments imposed stay-at-home orders to slow the virus' spread, reducing patient overload in hospitals. By April, the U.S. had the most cases of any country, at 100,000. By May 2022, one million had died. Unemployment rates were the highest since the Great Depression. The biggest mass vaccination campaign in U.S. history started in December 2020. The May 2020 murder of George Floyd caused mass protests and riots in many cities over police brutality. Many organizations attempted to rid themselves of institutionalized racism. 2020 was also marked by a rise in domestic terrorist threats and widespread conspiracy theories around mail-in voting and COVID-19. The QAnon conspiracy theory gained publicity. Multiple major cities were hit by rioting and fighting between far-left anti-fascist groups and far-right groups like the Proud Boys.

=== Biden administration ===
In 2021, Biden completed the withdrawal of American troops from Afghanistan, which fell to the Taliban immediately after. Biden signed into law the American Rescue Plan Act of 2021 and other bills regarding infrastructure, gun reform, inflation reduction, and healthcare for veterans, among other issues. In 2022, the Supreme Court ruling in Dobbs v. Jackson overturned Roe v. Wade and Planned Parenthood v. Casey and sparked nationwide protests. Biden appointed Ketanji Brown Jackson to become the first Black woman to serve on the court. In 2022, following Russia's full-scale invasion of Ukraine, the administration provided military and economic aid to Ukraine and coordinated sanctions against Russia with NATO allies. Meanwhile, the U.S. supported Israel in the Gaza war. In July 2024, Biden dropped out of the race and endorsed Kamala Harris for president. Trump won the election, making Biden the first president to be succeeded and preceded by the same president since Benjamin Harrison.

=== Second Trump administration ===
==== Domestic affairs ====
In November 2024, Trump was elected president to a nonconsecutive second term, becoming the second U.S. president to serve two nonconsecutive terms, after Grover Cleveland in 1892. Trump pardoned about 1,500 people convicted of offenses in the January 6 Capitol attack of 2021. On immigration, the Laken Riley Act was passed as well as executive orders blocking asylum-seekers from entry to the U.S. He reinstated the national emergency at the Mexico–U.S. border, designated drug cartels as terrorist organizations, and attempted to end birthright citizenship. Trump established the Department of Government Efficiency (DOGE), briefly led by Elon Musk, which was tasked with cutting spending by the federal government, limiting bureaucracy, and which oversaw mass layoffs of civil servants before disbanding in late 2025.

With passage of the OBBBA in 2025, the administration allocated funding to carry out most of its planned domestic policy, including more than 1,000 miles of southern border wall construction, making permanent the 2017 TCJA tax cuts, and a historic increase in ICE's budget to effect what the administration promised would be the largest deportation program since Eisenhower.

Artemis II launch in 2026, the first crewed mission around the Moon since the Apollo program

In April 2026, the Artemis II lunar flyby mission, carrying the first astronauts around the Moon since Apollo 17 in 1972, launched. The Artemis program was created in 2017 under the first Trump administration and aims to construct a long-term moonbase in the 2030s.

==== Foreign affairs ====
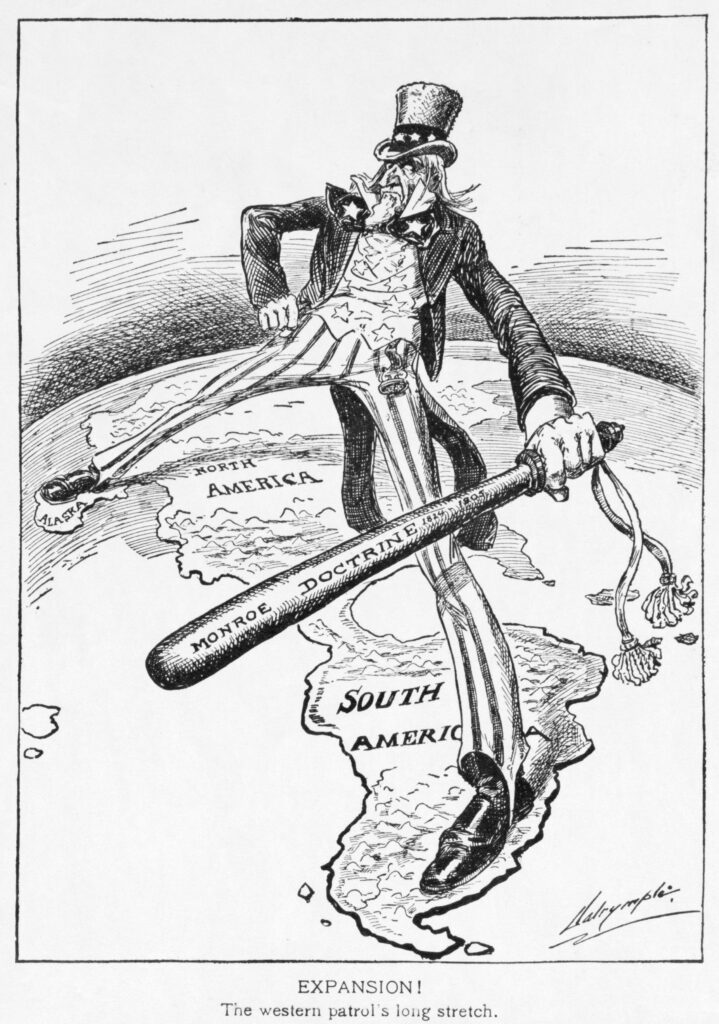
The Monroe Doctrine featured prominently as the primary foreign policy of the administration

Trump withdrew the US from the World Health Organization and Paris Climate Accords. He started a trade war with Canada and Mexico and continued a trade war with China.

Amid the Russian invasion of Ukraine, the Trump administration engaged in peace negotiations, but the war reached its 4-year anniversary with little sign of abatement. In response to the Gaza war, the administration brokered a peace deal that led to the United Nations Security Council Resolution 2803 and the formation of a Gaza Board of Peace, designed to administrate the recovery and reconstruction of the Gaza Strip.

Trump invoked the Monroe Doctrine, a foreign policy position first expressed by 5th President James Monroe, which asserts that the US has broad authority to take actions in the interest of its national security within the Western Hemisphere, to justify the capture of Venezuelan President Nicholas Maduro in 2026 Operation Absolute Resolve and to constrain alleged undue Chinese-owned firm influence in the operation of the Panama Canal.

In Iran, in mid-2025 the administration neutralized alleged sites where Iran was enriching weapon grade uranium, then entered diplomatic negotiations in hopes for a long-term arms control and nuclear treaty with Iran. Mass protests occurred in Iran with the regime reportedly killing as many as 35,000 dissenters. Negotiations failed and on February 28, 2026, the US launched strikes on Iran. The long-time leader of Iran, Ali Khamenei was assassinated at his compound. The strike became the opening salvo of the 2026 Iran war which later led to the Strait of Hormuz crisis and a global fuel crisis.

Since the beginning of his term, Trump has threatened American withdrawal from NATO, despite the highly significant role of the US in the alliance, alongside its threats to the sovereignty of two NATO-founding countries, Canada and the Kingdom of Denmark, triggering an unprecedented NATO crisis. Combined with its trade war with the EU, and particularly Denmark's position as a European state, decades of Euro–American relations have been "undone". In the 2026 midterm elections, Democrats won a majority of Senate and House seats, taking back control of Congress, and also won multiple governor's races, which many believed to be a reaction to the Trump administration's second term and much of the country's dissatisfaction with it.

== See also ==
- Outline of the history of the United States
- Bibliography of American history
- History of North America
- History of the Southern United States
- List of historians by area of study
- List of history journals

=== By period ===
- An Indigenous Peoples' History of the United States
- Colonial era
- United States factor

=== By topic ===
- Agriculture
- Cities
- Culture
- Economy
- Education
- Foreign policy
- Government
  - Presidents
- Immigration
- Military
- Religion
- Sports
- Territorial evolution
- Women

=== Other topics ===
- Politics
- Racism
- Territories

== Sources ==
- "Lesson Plan on "What Made George Washington a Good Military Leader?"". Archived from the original on June 11, 2011.
- "Outline of American History – Chapter 1: Early America". usa.usembassy.de. Archived from the original on November 20, 2016.
- Beard, Charles A.; Beard, Mary Ritter; Jones, Wilfred (1927). The Rise of American civilization. Macmillan.
- Chenault, Mark; Ahlstrom, Rick; Motsinger, Tom (1993). In the Shadow of South Mountain: The Pre-Classic Hohokam of 'La Ciudad de los Hornos', Part I and II.
- Coffman, Edward M. (1998). The War to End All Wars: The American Military Experience in World War I.
- Cogliano, Francis D. (2009). Revolutionary America, 1763–1815: A Political History (2nd ed.). Routledge. ISBN 978-0-415-96486-9.
- Cooper, John Milton (2001). Breaking the Heart of the World: Woodrow Wilson and the Fight for the League of Nations. Cambridge University Press. ISBN 9780521807869.
- Corbett, P. Scott; Janssen, Volker; Lund, John M.; Pfannestiel, Todd; Waskiewicz, Sylvie; Vickery, Paul (June 26, 2020). "3.3 English settlements in America. The Chesapeake colonies: Virginia and Maryland. The rise of slavery in the Chesapeake Bay Colonies". U.S. history. OpenStax. Archived from the original on August 8, 2020.
- Dangerfield, George (1963). The Era of Good Feelings: America Comes of Age in the Period of Monroe and Adams Between the War of 1812, and the Ascendancy of Jackson.
- Day, A. Grove (1940). Coronado's Quest: The Discovery of the Southwestern States. Archived from the original on July 26, 2012 – via Questia.
- Gaddis, John Lewis (2005). The Cold War: A New History.
- Gaddis, John Lewis (1989). The Long Peace: Inquiries Into the History of the Cold War.
- Gaddis, John Lewis (1972). The United States and the Origins of the Cold War, 1941–1947. Columbia University Press. ISBN 9780231122399.
- Goodman, Paul. The First American Party System. in Chambers, William Nisbet; Burnham, Walter Dean, eds. (1967). The American Party Systems: Stages of Political Development.
- Greene, John Robert (1995). The Presidency of Gerald R. Ford.
- Greene, Jack P. & Pole, J. R., eds. (2003). A Companion to the American Revolution (2nd ed.). Wiley. ISBN 9781405116749.
- Guelzo, Allen C. (2012). "Chapter 3–4". Fateful Lightning: A New History of the Civil War and Reconstruction. Oxford University Press, USA. ISBN 9780199843282.
- Guelzo, Allen C. (2006). Lincoln's Emancipation Proclamation: The End of Slavery in America.
- Hamlin, C. H. (1927) The war myth in United States history New York: The Vanguard Press
- Henretta, James A. (2007). "History of Colonial America". Encarta Online Encyclopedia. Archived from the original on September 23, 2009.
- Hine, Robert V.; Faragher, John Mack (2000). The American West: A New Interpretive History. Yale University Press.
- Howe, Daniel Walker (2009). What Hath God Wrought: The Transformation of America, 1815–1848. Oxford History of the United States. p. 798. ISBN 9780199726578.
- Jacobs, Jaap (2009). The Colony of New Netherland: A Dutch Settlement in Seventeenth-Century America (2nd ed.). Cornell University Press. Archived from the original on July 29, 2012 – via Questia.
- Jensen, Richard J.; Davidann, Jon Thares; Sugital, Yoneyuki, eds. (2003). Trans-Pacific relations: America, Europe, and Asia in the twentieth century. Greenwood.
- Kennedy, David M. (1999). Freedom from Fear: The American People in Depression and War, 1929–1945. Oxford History of the United States.
- Kennedy, David M.; Cohen, Lizabeth; Bailey, Thomas A. (2002). The American Pageant: A History of the Republic (12th ed.). Boston: Houghton Mifflin. ISBN 9780618103492.
- McPherson, James M. (February 25, 1988). Battle Cry of Freedom: The Civil War Era. Oxford University Press. ISBN 9780195038637.
- Middleton, Richard; Lombard, Anne (2011). Colonial America: A History to 1763. Wiley. ISBN 9781405190046.
- Milkis, Sidney M.; Mileur, Jerome M., eds. (2002). The New Deal and the Triumph of Liberalism.
- Miller, John C. (1960). The Federalist Era: 1789–1801. Harper & Brothers.
- Norton, Mary Beth; et al. (2011). A People and a Nation, Volume I: to 1877 (9th ed.). Houghton Mifflin. ISBN 9780495916550.
- Ogawa, Dennis M.; Fox, Evarts C. Jr. (1991). Japanese Americans, from Relocation to Redress.
- Patterson, James T. (1997). Grand Expectations: The United States, 1945–1974. Oxford History of the United States.
- Rable, George C. (2007). But There Was No Peace: The Role of Violence in the Politics of Reconstruction.
- Riley, Glenda (2001) [1986]. Inventing the American Woman: An Inclusive History, Volume 1: to 1877 (3rd ed.). Harlan Davidson. ISBN 978-0-88295-957-3.
- Savelle, Max (2005) [1948]. Seeds of Liberty: The Genesis of the American Mind. Kessinger Publishing. pp. 185–190. ISBN 9781419107078.
- Shlaes, Amity (2008). The Forgotten Man: A New History of the Great Depression. New York City, U.S.: HarperPerennial. ISBN 978-0-06-093642-6.
- Stagg, J. C. A. (1983). Mr Madison's War: Politics, Diplomacy and Warfare in the Early American Republic, 1783–1830. Princeton University Press. ISBN 0691047022.
- Stagg, J. C. A. (2012). The War of 1812: Conflict for a Continent. Cambridge University Press. ISBN 978-0-521-89820-1.
- Stannard, David E. (1993). American Holocaust: The Conquest of the New World. Oxford University Press, USA. ISBN 978-0-19-508557-0.
- Stanley, Peter W. (1974). A Nation in the Making: The Philippines and the United States, 1899–1921. pp. 269–272.
- Thornton, Russell (1991). "The Demography of the Trail of Tears Period: A New Estimate of Cherokee Population Losses". In Anderson, William L. (ed.). Cherokee Removal: Before and After.
- Tooker, Elisabeth (1990). "The United States Constitution and the Iroquois League". In Clifton, J. A. (ed.). The Invented Indian: Cultural Fictions and Government Policies. Transaction Publishers. pp. 107–128. ISBN 9781560007456.
- van Dijk, Ruud; et al. (2013). Encyclopedia of the Cold War. Routledge. pp. 863–864. ISBN 9781135923112.
- Vann Woodward, C. (1974). The Strange Career of Jim Crow (3rd ed.).
- Wilentz, Sean (2008). The Age of Reagan: A History, 1974–2008. Harper. ISBN 9780060744809.
- Wood, Gordon S. (2009). Empire of Liberty: A History of the Early Republic, 1789–1815. Oxford History of the United States. Oxford University Press. ISBN 9780195039146.
- Zinn, Howard (2003). A People's History of the United States. HarperPerennial Modern Classics. ISBN 9780060528423.
- Zophy, Angela Howard, ed. (2000). Handbook of American Women's History (2nd ed.). Garland. ISBN 9780824087449.
- Catherine Locks, Sarah Mergel, Pamela Roseman, Tamara Spike & Marie Lasseter. History in the Making: A History of the People of the United States of America to 1877 // Dahlonega, Georgia : The University Press of North Georgia – 2013. ISBN 978-0-9882237-3-8
