= History of St. Louis before 1762 =

The history of St. Louis, Missouri, from prehistory to 1762 was marked by the presence of the Moundbuilder indigenous culture, the explorations of Europeans, and the establishment of French trading posts along the Mississippi River.

== Early settlements ==
The earliest settlements in the St. Louis area were built by the people of the Mississippian culture, who constructed more than two dozen burial mounds within what would become the city of St. Louis. The earliest mounds in the area date to approximately 1050, but much about the mound builders in St. Louis is unknown. Although some of the St. Louis area settlement is preserved at the Cahokia Mounds site in Illinois, the mounds in St. Louis were nearly all demolished. Only one mound remains within the city (Sugarloaf Mound), although St. Louis retained the nickname "The Mound City" well into the 19th century.

One of the primary causes of settlement for indigenous peoples was the presence of the Mississippi River and its tributaries, especially the Missouri River. Native Americans used the large forests located along the river to construct canoes, which were then used for transport on the rivers. After the end of the Mississippian culture in the 14th century and due to pressures from French Canadian settlers, Siouan-speaking groups such as the Missouria and Osage migrated to the Missouri valley, living in villages along the Osage and Missouri rivers. Both groups lived in conflict with northeastern tribes such as the Sauk and Meskwaki, and all four groups confronted the earliest explorers of Missouri.

== European exploration of the Mississippi valley ==
European exploration of the area began nearly a century before the city of St. Louis was officially founded. In the early 1670s, Jean Talon, the Intendant of New France, ordered an exploration of the potential of the Mississippi River after hearing of rumors that it connected to the Pacific Ocean. On this mission, explorer Louis Joliet and Jesuit priest Jacques Marquette arrived at the Mississippi River in June 1673 and traveled past the confluence of the Missouri and Mississippi to the mouth of the Arkansas River. At this point Joliet returned north after determining the river would not reach the Pacific and fearing attack by Spanish settlers.

Nine years later, French explorer La Salle led an expedition south from the Illinois river to the mouth of the Mississippi and claimed the entire valley for France. La Salle named the Mississippi river basin Louisiana after King Louis XIV; the region between and near the confluence of the Ohio and Mississippi was named Illinois Country. As part of a series of forts in the Mississippi valley, in 1699 the French built a settlement on the east bank of the Mississippi at Cahokia, Illinois, near the Cahokia Mounds complex. The next year, the Kaskaskia tribe established a village at a small river within the present area of St. Louis. With them two Jesuit priests, Pierre-Gabriel Marest and Francois Pinet, built a small mission at the site, naming the river the River Des Peres (River of the Fathers). However, by 1703 the site was abandoned as the Kaskaskia moved to the east bank and further south to a new settlement named Kaskaskia, Illinois.

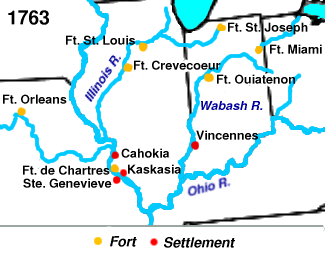
French settlements and forts in the Illinois Country in 1763 with current U.S. state boundaries for reference

== French settlements and the Seven Years' War ==
Organized development of the Mississippi valley began with a grant of a trade monopoly in 1712 to Antoine Crozat, with the goal of finding and mining precious stones, gold and silver. However, Crozat's venture failed by 1717 due to Spanish interference, and he relinquished his charter. The next company to be granted a trade monopoly for the region was led by John Law, a Scottish financier. In 1717, Law convinced Louis XV's ministers to provide the Company of the West a 25-year monopoly of trade and ownership of all mines, while promising to settle 6,000 whites and 3,000 black slaves and build churches throughout the region. The company founded New Orleans as the capital of Louisiana in 1718, and merged with other companies in 1719 to form the Company of the Indies. In spite of a financial crisis and the ouster of Law in 1720, the Company of the Indies established a capital of the Illinois Country (upper Louisiana) at Fort de Chartres, 15 miles north of Kaskaskia on the east bank of the Mississippi. Another early settlement near present-day St. Louis, Ste. Genevieve, Missouri, was built in 1732 across from the Kaskaskia village as a convenient port for salt and ore mined on the western side of the Mississippi.

Although the Company of the Indies began making trade ties with Missouri River tribes in the early 1720s and 1730s, French economic policy focused on trade with the Spanish colony of New Mexico to the southwest. Several trade expeditions between New Mexico and the Mississippi valley occurred between 1739 and the Seven Years' War of 1756–1763. However, the war had destroyed the wealth of many French trading firms and merchants based in New Orleans, and the French governor of Louisiana began granting trade monopolies in several areas at the conclusion of the war to stimulate growth.
