= Cahokia Woodhenge =

Series of timber circles at the Cahokia archaeological site, US

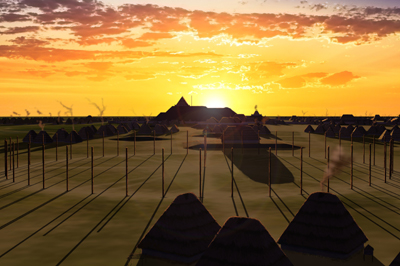
- Artist's conception of Woodhenge III at sunrise circa 1000 CE

- Location within Illinois
- 38°39′36.1794″N 90°4′30″W
- Cultures: Middle Mississippian culture
- Location: Collinsville, Illinois, United States
- Region: Madison County, Illinois

Site notes
- Architectural style: timber circle Number of temples:
- Archaeologists: Warren Wittry, Robert L. Hall, William R. Iseminger

The Cahokia Woodhenge was a series of large timber circles located roughly 850 metres (2,790 ft) to the west of Monks Mound at the Mississippian culture Cahokia archaeological site near Collinsville, Illinois, United States. They are thought to have been constructed between 900 and 1100 CE, with each one being larger and having more posts than its predecessor. The site was discovered as part of salvage archaeology in the early 1960s interstate highway construction boom, and one of the circles was reconstructed in the 1980s. The circle has been used to investigate archaeoastronomy at Cahokia. Annual equinox and solstice sunrise observation events are held at the site.

== Discovery and excavation ==
The existence of the series of woodhenges at Cahokia was discovered during salvage archaeology undertaken by Warren Wittry in the early 1960s in preparation for a proposed highway interchange. Although the majority of the site contained village house features, a number of unusually shaped large post holes were also discovered. The post holes were 7 feet (2 m) in length and 2 feet (60 cm) in width and formed sloping ramps to accommodate the insertion and raising of the estimated 20 feet (6 m) tall posts to a 4 feet (1 m) depth into the ground. When the holes were plotted out it was realized that they formed several arcs of equally spaced holes. Detailed analytical work supported the hypothesis that the placement of these posts was by design. Wittry hypothesized that the arcs could be whole circles and that the site was possibly a calendar for tracking solar events such as solstice and equinoxes. He began referring to the circles as "woodhenges"; comparing the structures to England's well-known circles at Woodhenge and Stonehenge.

Additional excavations were undertaken at the site by Robert L. Hall in 1963. Hall used the predicted locations from the arcs found in the previous excavation and was able to find more post holes as well as posts near the centers of the circles now thought to be central observation points. Wittry undertook another series of excavations at the site in the late 1970s and confirmed the existence of five separate timber circles in the general vicinity. The circles are now designated Woodhenges I through V in Roman numerals. Each was a different diameter and had a different number of posts. Because four of the circles overlap each other it is thought they were built in a sequence, with each iteration generally being larger and containing twelve more posts than its predecessor.

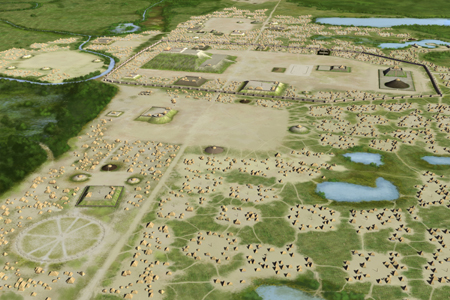
Woodhenge lies to the west of Monks Mound, at the lower left edge of the illustration.

The remains of several posts were discovered in the post pits. The type of wood used, red cedar (Juniperus virginiana), is considered sacred by many Native American groups. The red cedar is the only native evergreen species in the area and is resistant to disease and decay. Traces of red ochre pigment was also found, suggesting that the posts were probably painted at some point. In 1985 William R. Iseminger led a series of excavations to finish finding a full circular sequence of posts. He was able to complete the sequence for what has become known as Woodhenge III (except for nine posts on the western edge that had been lost to dump trucks for road construction fill) and then led a reconstruction of the circle. The reconstruction team was able to obtain enough red cedar logs for half of the holes and then made do with black locust (Robinia pseudoacacia) for the other half; placing them into the original excavated post positions. The Illinois Historic Preservation Division (a division of the Illinois Department of Natural Resources) oversees the Cahokia site and hosts public sunrise observations at the vernal and autumnal equinoxes and the winter and summer solstices. Out of respect for Native American beliefs these events do not feature ceremonies or rituals of any kind.

== Construction sequence ==
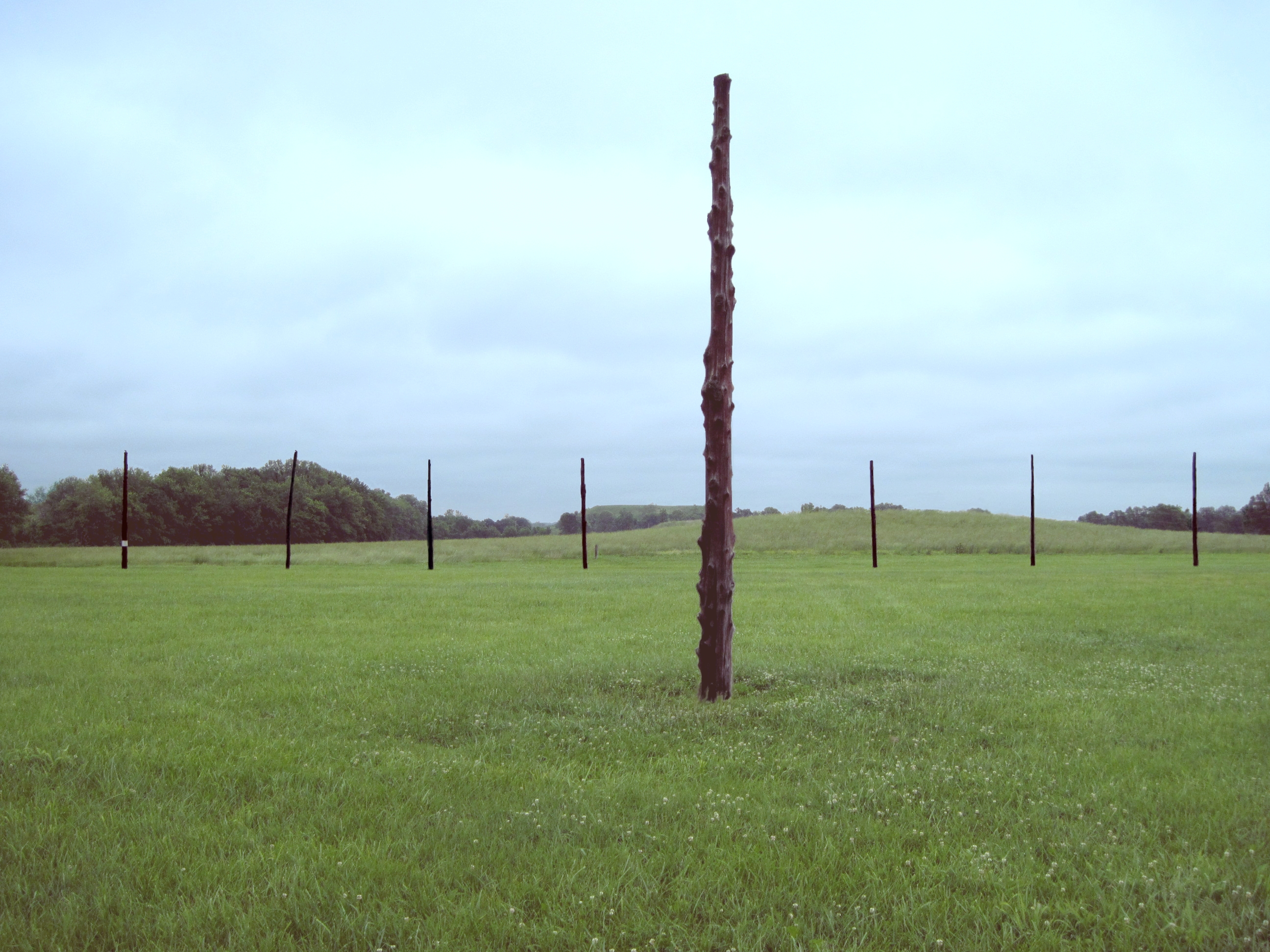
View of the reconstructed Woodhenge III and its alignment with the equinox pole and Monks Mound .5 miles (0.80 km) away

The structure was rebuilt a number of times during the urban center's roughly 300-year history. The presence of single set posthole houses and midden deposits at the location suggests the area was a habitation area during the early Emergent Mississippian period; before the timber circles were constructed. And a separate layer of later Mississippian wall trench houses suggests it became a habitation area again after the final woodhenge was no longer in use.

- Woodhenge I was located to the east of the other circles, the only one not built on the same spot as the other four. It had 24 posts and was 240 feet (73 m) in diameter. This circle was dismantled and at a later date Mound 44 was constructed, partially covering this location.
- Woodhenge II was constructed to the west of the previous circle. It had 36 posts and was 408 feet (124 m) in diameter.
- Woodhenge III had 48 posts and was 410 feet (120 m) in diameter. It is thought to have been constructed in approximately 1000 CE. This version of the woodhenge was reconstructed in 1985 using the original holes found during excavations. The 48 posts of the circle are set at 7° 30′ (7 degrees 30 minutes) apart as measured from the geometric center of the circle, although the central post of the circle is offset from the true center by 5.6 feet (1.7 m) to the east. This facilitates the alignment with perimeter posts marking the winter and summer solstice sunrise positions, correcting for the latitude of Cahokias location.
- Woodhenge IV had 60 posts and was 476 feet (145 m) in diameter.
- Woodhenge V had an arc and post spacing that suggests it was 446 feet (136 m) in diameter and could have had 72 posts, although only 13 posts were found in a short arc facing the direction of the sunrise. Archaeologists suspect it may not have been a full timber circle and that by this time the large trees needed for the posts may have been getting scarce in the vicinity of Cahokia.

The largest marker post recovered from Cahokia is known as the Mitchell Log, which in its current state is 11 feet (3.4 m) tall and 2,200 pounds (1,000 kg). 2025 radiocarbon dating and strontium stable isotope analysis of the Mitchell Log by University of Arizona researchers found the tree had been felled around 1124 ce at an estimated age of 194 years old, and that it had been transported around 100 miles (160 km) to the site at the time of its construction. At the time of the tree being felled, it is estimated to have been 60 feet (18 m) tall and around 11,000 pounds (5,000 kg). It is speculated that this log and others were transported to the site via Mississippi backwater channels as opposed to over-land.

=== Alignments ===
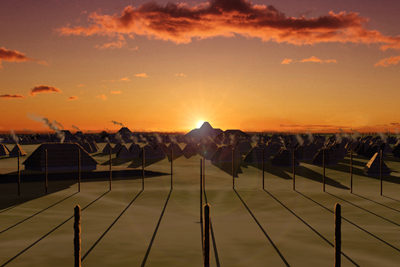
Artist's conception of midwinter sunrise over Mound 60 as seen from Woodhenge III

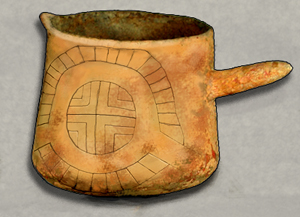
Ceramic beaker with woodhenge motif

The woodhenge is thought by archaeologists to be a solar calendar, capable of marking equinox and solstice sunrises and sunsets for the timing of the agricultural cycle and religious observances. During the equinoxes the sun rises due east of the timber circle. From the vantage point of the center of the circle it appears as if the sun is emerging from the front of Monks Mound which is roughly .5 miles (0.80 km) away. One of the reasons for the changing position and size of the timber circles may have been the growing size of Monks Mound as additional layers of earth raised its height and increased its geographic footprint and the desire to keep this symbolic emergence and alignment intact.

The winter solstice sunrise pole is aligned with the Fox Mound (Mound 60, a rectangular platform mound paired with a conical burial mound, Mound 59) which sits across the grand plaza 1,640 feet (500 m) to the south of Monks Mound. The top of the roughly 46 feet (14 m) tall mound projects above the horizon and in Cahokian times would have had a large temple structure at its summit, raising it even higher. From the central pole of Woodhenge III the sun would have appeared to rise from this mound and temple at the winter solstice. Besides their celestial marking functions, the woodhenges also carried religious and ritual meaning that are reflected in their stylized depiction as a cross in circle motif on ceremonial beakers. One prominent example has markers added to the winter sunrise and sunset positions, and was found in an offertory pit near the winter solstice post pit. It also had radiating lines that probably symbolized the rays of the sun.

As there are many more posts than are necessary for these simple alignments some archaeoastronomists have speculated that they were also used to observe other celestial events, such as lunar cycles, the motion of the Pleiades, or other stars and planets; while others have suggested they were used to align mound and causeway constructions projects.

== See also ==
- List of archaeoastronomical sites by country
- Mound 34
