= Mythspeaker =

2026 novel by Christopher Roubique

Mythspeaker is the first published novel by Christopher Roubique, a Cajun and Indigenous author from Wisconsin, with cover art by Khadija Khatib.

== Setting ==
The story is set in the world of Ona, an imaginary America, implicitly around the time of the first European colonisation of the Americas. According to an author's note by Roubique, "All characters, peoples, languages, myths, and elements of the story are my own creation, inspired by the rich cultures that have called North America home since long before the words 'North America' were ever spoken." The Indigenous characters in the story belong to an ethnic group called the Ay'do (which according to the book's pronunciation guide is pronounced "ay-doh"), an ethnic group comprising seven tribes, each associated with different ecosystems and expertise. The principal city is Tlera Tana, which according to Roubique was inspired by the historical settlement Cahokia: "I started imagining what it might have been like had that city kept growing for hundreds of years, and that idea became another piece of this story."

What in the real world is usually called North America is a turtle, Gonoka, on whose back civilisation rests. As well as being populated by humans, the world is also inhabited by "living myths", sentient animals. A short time before the action of the novel, Gonoka has been settled by colonists from another continent, known to the Ay'do as the Tenemusuh. They have established a city called New Colum.

== Form ==
The novel largely comprises third-person, past-tense narrative told from the perspective of Kyta, the protagonist.

Several chapters, however, are told from the point of view of a "beast", who the reader gradually learns is an Old World living-myth-lion enslaved by the novel's villain, Endellion, through the power of a plant called blankweed. These chapters are distinguished from the others by being set in bold type.

== Summary ==
The central character is Kytalumdi (Kyta), thirteen-year-old son of the mythspeaker of Tlera Tana. Kyta has a supernatural ability to understand and speak any foreign language. At the age of five, Kyta was visited by the Deer Mother, a living myth, who tells him, cryptically, this it is his destiny to save Gonoka. Haunted by this prospect, Kyta grows up isolated; his only friend is the forest-dwelling living myth Old Moon Eyes, who usually takes the form of a rabbit.

The Ay'do are the traditional keepers of Gonoka's egg. While wandering with Old Moon Eyes, Kyta discovers that the Tenemusuh have slain its guards and stolen the egg. Knowing that, if her offspring dies, Gonoka will sink into the ocean in grief, destroying civilisation, Kyta rushes back to Tlera Tana to report the news. Because he is the news-bearer and because of his father's status, Kyta attends the council of chiefs. Inspired by a traditional story of Takyita the coyote stealing fire from Lightning, Kyta proposes that the Ay'do steal the egg back. Instead, the council determines to visit the Tenemusuh, explain the gravity of the situation, and ask for the egg back.

Kyta joins the embassy to the Tenemusuh's city New Collum as interpreter. He meets the Tenemusuh's megalomaniacal lord, Endellion, and Endellion's daughter Mary. He discovers that Endellion has been gathering a menagerie of exotic animals and that the egg is stored in the menagerie (along with the captured Old Moon Eyes). Endellion refuses to return the egg and threatens to smash it if the Ay'do seek it by force.

The failed embassy returns to Tlera Tana, and Kyta convinces his father to let him try to steal the egg. On the model of the story of Coyote, Kyta assembles a team of four people his own age for his "heist": Yudove, skilled in horsecraft, who is under sanctions for trying to steal a myth-horse from the East Wind; Eno, a gender-non-binary prophet exiled from his tribe for prophesying that Gonoka's egg will break on his birthday, and consequently crippled by low self-esteem; and Tumuhv, a hot-headed, rude, violent, and unthinking warrior.

The team ride to New Collum and, aided by Eno's climbing skills, sneak into the menagerie, only to find that the egg has been moved. Yudove discovers four kidnapped jewel horses and, appalled by their state, screams, attracting the attention of guards. The children flee.

Discouraged by the failure of their attempt, the children argue, and Kyta attempts to return to New Collum alone. He is intercepted by the living myth Coyote, who helps his face the psychological damage done by Deer Mother and to understand that he needs his whole team. Coyote gives Kyta a magic object that will allow him to pass, once, through a solid barrier.

Kyta returns to the team, discovering that Yudove has likewise been facing her inner fears. The two help Eno and Tumuhv to address their own traumas, and the four return to New Collum. In the menagerie, they rescue Old Moon Eyes, who reports that the egg has been taken to Endellion's castle. Freeing animals from the menagerie to distract Endellion's guards, the team use Coyote's magic object to enter Endellion's home. They are discovered by Mary, who, fortunately, has come to appreciate the magic of Gonoka's egg and the barbarity of her father. On the condition that they rescue her hound from her father, Mary directs the team to Endellion's treasure-chamber, where the egg is held.

The team is, however, found by Endellion, who has his ogres attack them. Through the magic of Old Moon Eyes, they manage to escape to the treasure chamber and lock themselves in. In the chamber they find the Beast. Using his linguistic skills, Kyta talks to the Beast, learning that it is a living-myth-lion, and frees it. The lion helps them escape the chamber with the egg, carrying them on its back to their waiting horses.

The team flees to Tlera Tana, harried by Endellion but protected by the lion. The lion eventually collapses from its wounds, but the Deer Mother arrives to heal it. The children ride on towards Tlera Tana, sending Yudove ahead to seek help. Endellion catches up with them, but Yudove brings aid just in time. The children are celebrated as heroes, and the egg is returned to its rightful place, where it hatches.

The story jumps forward thirty days, to Kyta's father receiving the name of the baby turtle from Gonoka: she is called Lulana, "She Who Wandered And By Faith Was Saved". Gonoka appoints Kyta as a mythspeaker and protector of Lulana. Kyta rejoices in having friends.

== Development ==
In blogposts and interviews, Roubique has commented in detail on the many attempts to write a successful novel, and many attempts to gain an agent and publisher, that led up to Mythspeaker. According to Roubique, the person who eventually became his agent

knew I didn’t have a book she could sell and that this sort of thing is never done for a variety of good reasons, but she believed in the way I wrote so much that she wanted to represent me anyway. [...] Melanie focused me on the thing she said my books lacked: a high concept. An irresistible hook. [...] And then one day, I had it.

Over the course of a week, I came up with 6 high concepts, and the very 1st of those became Mythspeaker.

But I still wasn’t done. I’d spent so long in the trenches that my writing style and voice had gotten muddled by my desperation to be what agents were looking for. Melanie read the first draft of Mythspeaker and said it was great, but she could tell I was holding back. She asked if I could try it again and do it exactly how I wanted, not for anyone else. So I rewrote the whole book.

== Reception ==
Kirkus Reviews recommended the book for 10–14-year-olds, commenting that "this adventure is Roubique’s debut, and it bears the signs of an author who’s still mastering the craft. A ponderous beginning and shaky sense of geography will lose some readers. But those who persist will be treated to a sturdy heist plot, a likable team of young people, occasionally stunning figurative language, and the beguiling concept of 'living myths' who interact with mortals".

Publishers Weekly recommended the book for 8–12-year-olds, concluding that "imaginative worldbuilding is enlivened by engaging characters contending with grounded emotions such as loneliness and insecurity as they strive to perform heroic and inspiring feats in this timeless and original celebration of Indigenous stories".

Writing for YA and Kids Books Central, Mark Buxton gave the book five stars out of five and said that "Kyta is a kind-hearted, humble, and determined boy who exhibits positive characteristics that young readers can admire. The plot includes action, drama, character conflict, and ends with an exciting, emotional climax. The resolution indicates a sequel will be forthcoming. I highly recommend this book for all middle-grade readers, especially those who enjoy folklore".
