= Monks Mound =

Largest Pre-Columbian earthwork in the Americas

- Aerial view of the Monks Mound. The concrete staircase follows the approximate course of the ancient wooden stairs

- Location within Illinois today
- 38°39′38.4″N 90°3′43.36″W
- Cultures: Mississippian culture
- Location: Collinsville, Illinois, Madison County, Illinois, United States
- Region: Madison County, Illinois

History
- Built: 900–950; 1076 years ago CE

Site notes
- Architectural style: Platform mound
- Archaeologists: Thomas I. Ramey

Monks Mound is the largest Pre-Columbian earthwork in the Americas and the largest pyramid north of Mesoamerica. The beginning of its construction dates from 900 to 955 CE. Located at the Cahokia Mounds UNESCO World Heritage Site near Collinsville, Illinois, the mound size was calculated in 1988 as about 100 feet (30 m) high, 955 feet (291 m) long including the access ramp at the southern end, and 775 feet (236 m) wide. This makes Monks Mound roughly the same size at its base as the Great Pyramid of Giza (13.1 acres / 5.3 hectares). The perimeter of its base is larger than the Pyramid of the Sun at Teotihuacan. As a platform mound, the earthwork supported a wooden structure on the summit.

Unlike Egyptian pyramids which were built of stone, the platform mound was constructed almost entirely of layers of basket-transported soil and clay. Because of this construction and its flattened top, over the years, it has retained rainwater within the structure. This has caused slumping, the avalanche-like sliding of large sections of the sides at the highest part of the mound. Its designed dimensions would have been significantly smaller than its present extent, but recent excavations have revealed that slumping was a problem even while the mound was being made.

== Construction and abandonment ==
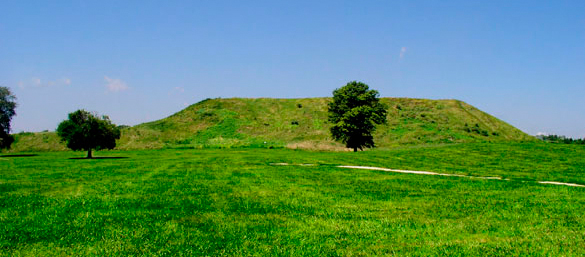
Monks Mound from the side showing the 2 terraces.

Construction of Monks Mound by the Mississippian culture began about 900–950 CE, on a site that had already been occupied by buildings. The original concept seems to have been a much smaller mound, now buried deep within the northern end of the present structure. At the northern end of the summit plateau, as finally completed around 1100 CE, is an area raised slightly higher still, on which was placed a building over 100 ft (30 m) long, the largest in the entire Cahokia Mounds urban zone. Excavations on the southwest corner found that several large ceremonial buildings had burned around 1150 CE.

Botanical remains from Monks Mound suggest it was built much more quickly than previously thought, perhaps on the order of several consecutive decades, providing an alternative view of its construction history. Deep excavations in 2007 confirmed findings from earlier test borings, that several types of earth and clay from different sources had been used successively. Study of various sites suggests that the stability of the mound was improved by the incorporation of bulwarks, some made of clay, others of sods from the Mississippi flood-plain, which permitted steeper slopes than the use of earth alone. The structure rises in four terraces to a height of 100 feet (30 m) with a rectangular base covering nearly 15 acres (6.1 ha) and containing 22 million cubic feet of adobe, carried basket by basket to the site.

The most recent section of the mound, added some time before 1200 CE, is the lower terrace at the south end, which was added after the northern end had reached its full height. It may partly have been intended to help minimize the slumping which by then was already under way. Today, the western half of the summit plateau is significantly lower than the eastern; this is the result of massive slumping, beginning about 1200 CE. This also caused the west end of the big building to collapse. It may have led to the abandonment of the mound's high status, following which various wooden buildings were erected on the south terrace, and garbage was dumped at the foot of the mound. By about 1300, the urban society at Cahokia Mounds was in serious decline. When the eastern side of the mound started to suffer serious slumping, it was not repaired.

== European settlers ==
There is no evidence of significant Native American settlement in the Cahokia Mounds urban area for hundreds of years after about 1400 CE. In 1735, French missionaries built a chapel at the west end of the south terrace of the mound. The River L'Abbe Mission served a small Illiniwek community, until they were forced to abandon the area by rival tribes about 1752. In 1776, during the American Revolutionary War, a trading post called the Cantine was established next to the mound (by then known as the Great Nobb). It lasted only until 1784.

In the early 19th century, the land was claimed by people of French descent, and Nicholas Jarrot had a deed for most of it. He donated some to a small group of French Trappist monks, who settled on one of the smaller mounds from 1809. They took advantage of the big mound's terraces to grow produce, which was elevated above the danger of flooding: wheat on the upper levels, garden produce on the south terrace. During their short stay in the area, which lasted until 1813, Henry Brackenridge visited the site and published the first detailed description of the largest mound. He named it Monks Mound.

In 1831 T. Amos Hill bought the plot including the Mound. He built a house on the upper terrace, and sank a well. This work revealed various archaeological remains, including human bones.

== Archaeology ==
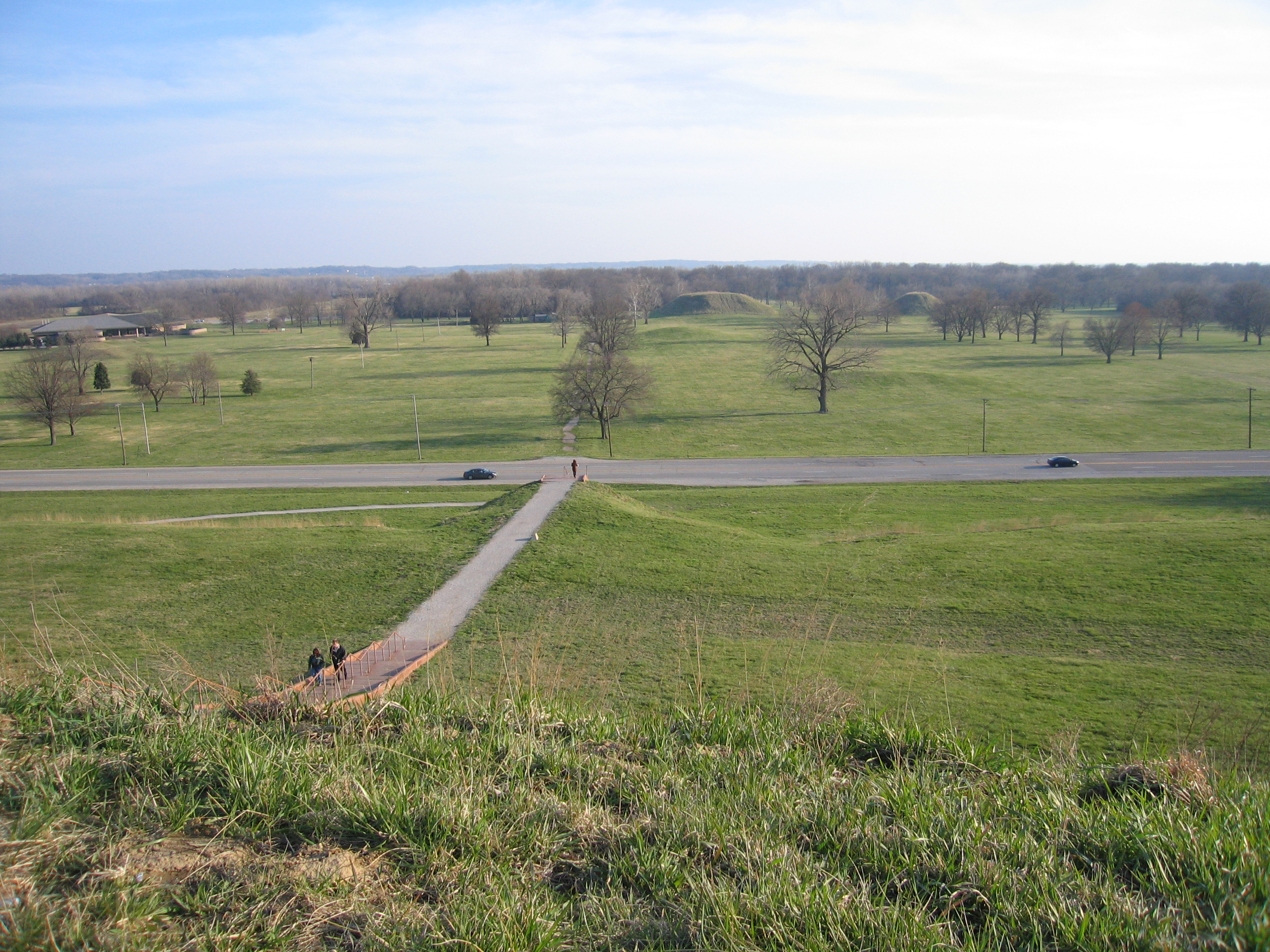
Looking over the Cahokia Mounds site from the top of Monks Mound

Thomas I. Ramey, who bought the site in 1864, began an era of more responsible ownership, and encouraged archaeological investigation. Many artifacts were found at or near the surface. Ramey had a tunnel made nearly 30 m (98 ft) into the north face of the mound, but it revealed nothing of historic interest. By this time, people were beginning to consider the mound more within its context. A survey made for local dentist Dr. John R. Patrick in the 1880s marked the beginning of modern understanding of the Cahokia site as a whole, and its relationship to other sites in the area.

Many archaeological investigations of the mound have taken place since then. One of the biggest began in the 1960s, when Nelson Reed, a local businessman and historian of native cultures, obtained permission to conduct excavations. He was trying to locate the high-status building (temple or palace) presumed to have stood at the peak of Monks Mound. By drilling cores at various points on the mound, his team revealed the various stages of its construction from the 10th to 12th centuries CE. Remains of a fairly recent house (presumably Hill's) were found, but no temple.

In 1970, Reed returned to work at the mound, and adopted a new strategy: scraping away the topsoil from several 5 m^{2} (54 sq ft) patches with a backhoe, to a depth of around 60 cm (24 in). This quickly revealed various features, including what appeared to be the outline of the temple. Further backhoe work in 1971 confirmed the shape of the presumed temple at over 30 m (98 ft) long, the largest building found at Cahokia. This technique was opposed by professional archaeologists because it destroyed several hundred years of stratification over most of the mound's summit, which was the evidence by which they could place and evaluate artifacts and construction. Reed's backhoe excavations revealed other significant features, such as a hole, which seemed to have been the socket for a post about three feet (one metre) in diameter. The dramatic finds encouraged the governor of Illinois to budget for an expansion of the Cahokia Mounds State Park.

== Preservation ==
From the time the original urban society collapsed, the great mound became overgrown with trees, the roots of which helped stabilize its steep slopes. In the 20th century, researchers removed the trees in the course of work at the mound and park preparation. Reduction of groundwater levels in the Mississippi floodplain during the 1950s caused the mound to dry out, damaging the clay layers within. When heavy rainfall occurred, it caused new slumping, starting about 1956. The increasingly violent weather of recent decades has exacerbated the problem. In 1984-5 there were several slumps, and the state government brought in surplus soil to make repairs to the major scar on the eastern side. A decade later, there was further slumping on the western side, so irregular that repair was impractical. Drains were installed to reduce the effects of heavy rain. It was during this process that workers discovered a mass of stone deep within the mound.

The repairs of the 1980s and 1990s were only partly successful. In 2004-5 more serious slumping episodes occurred. These demonstrated that adding new earth to repair the major slump on the east side had been a mistake. Experts decided to take a new approach. In 2007, backhoes were used to dig out the entire mass of earth from this slump and another at the northwest corner, to a level beyond the internal slippage zone. Engineers created a series of anti-slip "steps" across the exposed face before the original earth (minus the imported repair material) was replaced at its original level. To avoid introducing water deep into the mound's interior, the work was carried out in high summer, and as quickly as possible. In parallel with the repair work, teams of archaeologists studied the evidence that was being revealed. The eastern sliding zone penetrated more deeply within the mound than originally estimated, and the excavation had to be very large- 50 feet (15 m) wide, to a height of 65 feet (20 m) above the mound base. This heightened concerns about a conflict between conservation and archaeology.

== See also ==
- List of Mississippian sites
- Mound 34
- Mound 72
- Southeastern Ceremonial Complex
- Sugarloaf Mound
- Silbury Hill
