= Mitchell Archaeological Site (Mitchell, Illinois) =

Archaeological site in Illinois, United States

- Mitchell Archeological Site
- U.S. National Register of Historic Places
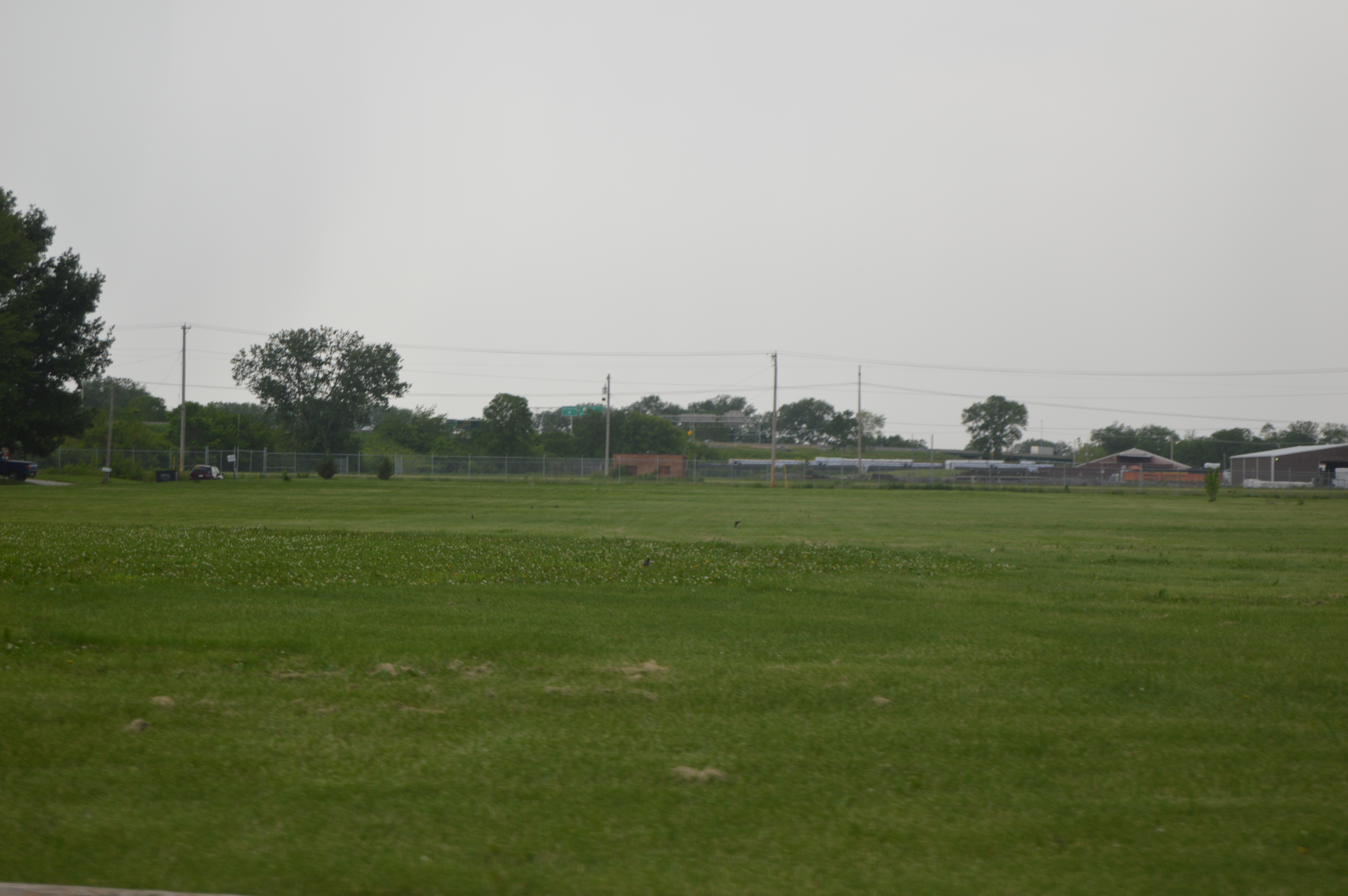
- Section north of Interstate 270

- Location within Illinois Location within the United States
- Location: Western end of University Dr., Mitchell, Illinois
- Coordinates: 38°42′15″N 90°4′7″W
- Area: 22.6 acres (9.1 ha)
- NRHP reference No.: 78001168 (original); 100010214 (increase)

Significant dates
- Added to NRHP: February 7, 1978
- Boundary increase: April 15, 2024

The Mitchell Archaeological Site is a pre-Columbian archaeological site located at the western end of University Drive in Mitchell, Illinois. The site includes a platform mound and the remains of a village; while it once included several other mounds, they have been destroyed by modern activity. Mississippian peoples inhabited the site c. 1150–1200. The site is affiliated with the Cahokia settlement system and was the largest site in the system except for Cahokia itself. However, the majority of the site was destroyed by the construction of Interstate 270; known information about the site mainly comes from salvage excavations conducted before the highway was built.

The site was added to the National Register of Historic Places on February 7, 1978.
