= Timothy Pauketat =

American archaeologist

Timothy R. Pauketat is an American archaeologist, retired director of the Illinois State Archaeological Survey, a former Illinois State Archaeologist, and professor emeritus of anthropology and medieval studies at the University of Illinois Urbana-Champaign. He is known for his historical theories and his investigations at Cahokia, the major center of precolonial Mississippian culture in the American Bottom region of Illinois near St. Louis, Missouri.

== Early life and education ==
Pauketat was exposed to archaeology at an early age, growing up amid family heirlooms and Native artifacts scattered about his family's property. Early on, he met Brad Koldehoff, who was similarly exposed to archaeology while growing up on the other side of their hometown of Millstadt, Illinois. In high school, he took an art class from Al Meyer, a veteran of the Mound 72 excavations at Cahokia. Pauketat's enthusiasm for archaeology grew. A few years later, Pauketat attended Southern Illinois University at Edwardsville, graduating in 1983 with a B.S. in Anthropology and Earth Sciences. His professors included Drs. Sidney Denny, William Woods, Charlotte Frisbie, Ted Frisbie, Alan Stueber, and Ronald Yarbrough. During college he worked as an intern for the U.S. Army Corps of Engineers, St. Louis District, learning from lead archaeologist Terry Norris, another veteran of the Mound 72 excavations at Cahokia. As a college student, he worked most summers on SIU-Edwardsville archaeology projects and, briefly, with the Center for American Archaeology, a cultural resource management program based at Kampsville, Illinois. Moving to SIU-Carbondale for a Masters degree, he was a research assistant for the Black Mesa archaeological project and as assistant curator for SIU-Carbondale from 1983-1984. At Carbondale, he learned from George Gumerman, Brian Butler, Jon Muller, George Sherman, Lynne Sullivan, William Andrefsky, Jr., and Robert Rand. He corresponded with the eminent professor James B. Griffin of the University of Michigan, who encouraged him to be critical of received wisdom.

Pauketat earned an M.A. in Anthropology from SIU-Carbondale in 1986 and then left for the University of Michigan to pursue his doctorate. At Michigan, Pauketat worked with Professors Henry Wright, Richard Ford, John O'Shea, and Jeff Parsons, and teamed up with then-students Preston Miracle, Andrew Darling, Alex Barker, David Anderson, and John Robb. A particularly memorable field encounter that he, Preston Miracle, and David Anderson had with the "dark forces" of American capitalism in 1987 is recorded in his 2007 book Chiefdoms and Other Archaeological Delusions. He earned his PhD in Anthropology in 1991.

== Academic career ==
Pauketat did a one-year post-doc at the University of Illinois as a visiting researcher with Charles Bareis, and in 1992 started as an assistant professor at the University of Oklahoma at Norman. During this period, he published his dissertation as his first single-authored book, The Ascent of Chiefs: Cahokia and Mississippian Politics in Native North America (1994). In 1996 he moved to the University at Buffalo, the State University of New York as an associate professor. In 1998, he accepted a position at the University of Illinois, where he became a full professor in 2005. He has published numerous professional papers, book chapters, additional books, and earned a Distinguished Service award from his department.

The years between the mid 1990s and the mid 2010s were filled with field work, field schools, and laboratory study. With funding from the National Science Foundation, the National Endowment for the Humanities, National Geographic, the Wenner Gren Foundation, and the John Templeton Foundation, Pauketat led excavations at a series of endangered archaeological sites on the margins of Greater Cahokia, including the Halliday, Pfeffer, Grossmann, and Emerald Acropolis sites. Up until 2019, he regularly taught classes such as “Introductory World Archaeology” and “Archaeological Theory". He also led the annual University of Illinois archaeological field school for 17 out of the 20 years that his primary appointment was with the Department of Anthropology at the University of Illinois. In 2019, he assumed the role of the Director of the Illinois State Archaeological Survey (ISAS), a division of the Prairie Research Institute at the University of Illinois. As director, he oversaw the research and compliance archaeology of upwards of 100 staff and transformed the research and engagement activities of ISAS, the largest archaeological organization of its kind in the U.S. He retired from this role in 2025.

Pauketat is a member of the Editorial Advisory Board of the archaeology journal Antiquity.

== Research ==
=== Cahokia ===
Pauketat has concentrated his own research on Cahokia, an Indigenous city at the center of a large, regional Mississippian culture that extended its influence up and down the Mississippi Valley and across its tributaries. He has excavated in Cahokia's grand plaza and surrounding settlements and platform mounds. He has also worked at outlying sites such as Halliday, Pfeffer, and Emerald in the uplands of the Mississippi valley. He ranks Cahokia as the prime society in the Mississippian world. The finding of similar mundane and ritual implements such as pottery, chunkey stones, and Mississippian stone statuary in locations as far afield as sites such as Spiro Mounds in Oklahoma, and the presence of resources from distant locales such as the Gulf of Mexico at Cahokia, show the extent of Cahokia's historical and political connections to the greater Mississippian world. He has entangled this spread of Cahokian material culture with the effects of a pax Cahokiana, all of which contributed to Cahokia's far-reaching influence.

Pauketat has used research from contemporaneous archaeological sites to formulate a comprehensive, large-scale picture of the Mississippian world. He is interested in investigating such questions as the emergence of civilization, especially as we might imagine that today to have involved human and other-than-human forces. He has investigated culture areas beyond the Mississippian heartland to define what he once called his "historical processual" approach. Today, that approach has been extended to draw on New Materialist theories and a variety of ontological or relational approaches to history and humanity.

Whatever the theoretical underpinnings, Pauketat has always relied on hard data and artifacts to discover new or previously ignored information. Doing so led him to an early reconstruction of Cahokian urban history as beginning around A.D. 1050, when pre-Cahokian settlements were suddenly transformed into the large, planned community of Cahokia proper, marked by a sudden preponderance of houses and the rapid adoption of wall-trench housing that replaced the previously common post-wall housing. Also during this time, a distinctive pattern of farmsteads developed in the uplands east of Cahokia proper, dubbed the "Richland complex" by Pauketat. The walls of houses in Richland farming settlements were set into trenches, but some post-wall and hybrid-wall forms were discovered. Initially considered an example of cultural resistance, the hybrid and traditional forms were later realized to be the homes of immigrants to the Greater Cahokia region. The documented Richland complex farmsteads are estimated to have housed thousands of persons, representing a huge population shift. This shift did not originate from local inhabitants, however, as pottery styles attest.

Pauketat and his colleagues noticed a great amount of artifact diversity among Richland sites, including some non-local pottery styles (“Varney Red Filmed”), and pottery-making methods of the local style (shell-tempered) that differed from the norm (thicker walls, etc.) These villages have fewer finely crafted items or ritual objects and a high percentage of workshop debris, likely indicating their purpose as support communities for the Cahokian elite. His notion of a transplanted farmer population is supported by the complete abandonment of these upland villages at the same time of Cahokia’s presumed collapse around two centuries later.

Pauketat questions established knowledge about ancient North America. For instance, due to improvements in radiometric dating and new methodologies, such as identification of domestic remains, he and other researchers have concluded that Cahokia rose and fell over a much shorter time period, around three hundred years, than had been previously attributed. The ubiquity of Cahokian-derived goods across much of then contemporaneous Midwest and Mid-South U.S. has also been examined. While this distribution was most certainly due to an exchange network, Pauketat posits relations between Cahokians and other Mississippians as not being purely environmentally determined, following previous interpretations ^{(by who?)}. Rather, he suggests that political relationships inspired much of the trading, as their natural environment satisfied their needs for survival. By trading, Cahokia may have been trying to bring outsiders within their sphere of influence, evidenced in the sudden large amount of Cahokian material culture found outside of Cahokia. At a more local scale, the sudden appearance and proliferation of Cahokian artifacts is coupled with housing reorganization of peoples and the incorporation of greater Cahokia.

=== Cultural Resource Management ===
Due to the nature of American archaeology, Pauketat participated in “salvage” or cultural resource management early on. This archaeology removes and documents cultural material before modern development destroys it. Today, he leads the largest rescue-archaeology or cultural resource management organization in the United States. Though often much more limited in scope and time than academic archaeology, Pauketat's book, The Ascent of Chiefs..., details how artifacts in part “salvaged” from the construction of a highway through Cahokia can be used to achieve the highest kind of intellectual knowledge production. Dividing up the artifacts by radiometrically dated and ceramic-seriated phases, he noted an increasing number of foreign goods as time progressed during the pre-Cahokian era. In that study, he interpreted this pattern to suggest the emergence of a new subcommunity or class of elites.

== Theoretical Foundations ==
In an interview with Peter Shea in 2013, Pauketat characterized his work as being about objects and their relationships to people. He insisted on the importance of research into materials as the only way to understand people and their histories, if not humanity itself. While respectful of the work of historians, he yet asserts that the written record misses important aspects of the human history. He says that understanding history means exploring the materiality of the past. He describes his approach to the past as being "object heavy." More recently, in a series of lectures, he has emphasized the importance of the archaeology of the intangible.

=== Processualism ===
In the 1990s and early 2000s, Pauketat championed practice-based, agency-focused, and phenomenological theories in archaeology, initiated as part of the post-processual movement in the 1980s and 1990s. These theories culminated in his 2007 book, Chiefdoms and Other Archaeological Delusions. Post-processual theory was a critique of processual archaeology, sometimes associated by critics with postmodernism. Today, the distinction is disappearing, as all archaeologists use the scientific method for basic inference construction. Theories of identity, landscape phenomenology, and agency are now central to 21st-century explanations of the past.

=== Practice Theory ===
Pauketat advocates a more historical approach to theory and a more theoretical approach to history. Practice theory also contributes to his understanding, that is, understanding changes in people’s habits and actions, provides an explanation for changes in the archaeological record. Pauketat stated that “... practices are always novel and creative, in some ways unlike those in other times or places...” when understood within their historical context. One method to ascertain the historical influences on practices is discerning traditions, or practices with a long temporal dimension. Traditions are the forms of practice most visible in the archaeological record; they can range from an arrowhead style to the preponderance of shell-tempered pottery throughout the U.S. Mid-South and Midwest during the Mississippian era. Tracking the change of archaeologically defined traditions tracks the changes of the archaeological culture, since tradition is a measure through which change can take place.

With regard to Cahokia, Pauketat used practice theory to interpret the proliferation of the chunkey stone. Pre-Cahokian American Bottom dwellers were using an early form of this round disc with two concave sides as early as 600 AD. This artifact is not found outside this region until the height of Cahokia about 400 years later. The sudden popularity and proliferation of the game pieces across the Mid-South and Southeast U.S. at this time suggests mass organization of the game played with this shaped stone. The massive plazas at Cahokia would have been an ideal setting, and large enough to accommodate all parts of Cahokian society. The organizers of the games, likely the Cahokian elite, could bring together all levels of society by using a longstanding tradition. This game tradition retained its prestige, continuing to be practiced until the 19th century among certain Native American tribes. It was ethnographically documented as a competition for the losing side’s worldly possessions.

== Recent work ==
After 2008, Pauketat turned to rethink religion and agency in human history, often through the lens of archaeoastronomy. Between 2009 and 2011, he worked with Danielle Benden and Robert Boszhardt (independent) to lead "The Mississippian Initiative" (funded by the National Science Foundation). The trio investigated sites in western Wisconsin at sites including the Fisher Mounds Site Complex and Trempealeau, which they believe to have been a short-term Cahokian "shrine complex," mission, or colony. In Wisconsin, they found evidence that the effects of Cahokians colonizing the north country in the 11th century AD resulted in profound, long-term change in the precolonial Native world.

Between 2012 and 2018, Pauketat worked with Susan Alt (Indiana University, Bloomington) on an even larger-scale investigation of upland "shrine complexes" due east of Cahokia. Over five intensive field seasons, Alt and Pauketat's teams undercovered evidence of periodic, large-scale religious events at a place dubbed the "Emerald Acropolis." Here, Pauketat verified his claims that Cahokian religion was centered on the long 18.6-year cycle of the Moon, drawing inspiration from colleagues at Chaco Canyon, in New Mexico, and the Hopewell sites of central Ohio. Since then, Alt and Pauketat have sought to understand the relationship between religion to politics generally, at sites in Wisconsin, Mississippi, Indiana, and Illinois. Like most pre-modern religions, those of precolonial America were practiced through rituals and events. Pauketat is seeking to understand the larger historical implications of such performed religion. He discusses this and other theories about Cahokia's connections and influence in his Cahokia: Ancient America's Great City on the Mississippi (2009). In an early review of this work, Pauketat's old mentor, William I. Woods, took issue with Pauketat's suggestion (on page 2) that Cahokia may have been in contact with Mesoamerican civilizations, and to his belief that they have important similarities in mythic images and religious beliefs. Woods notes that James B. Griffin, "the dean of Eastern North American archaeology," repeatedly stated that there was "absolutely no evidence for direct contact between Mesoamerica and Cahokia." C. Wesson says that Pauketat presents this theory but is not committed to proving a connection between Cahokia and ancient Mexico; rather it is one of several alternatives that he explores to provide an overview of the field.

Pauketat's An Archaeology of the Cosmos: Rethinking Agency and Religion in Ancient America was published in 2013. The previous year he also edited the volume, The Oxford Handbook of North American Archaeology (2012). Since then, several other volumes of his have been published. Most recently, Pauketat has written an extended treatment of the big history of North America that includes the effects of both Medieval climate change and Mesoamerica on the rest of North America. His latest book is Gods of Thunder: How Climate Change, Travel, and Spirituality Reshaped Precolonial North America (2023).

== Selected works ==
- (2023) Gods of Thunder: How Climate Change, Travel, and Spirituality Reshaped Precolonial America, Oxford University Press.
- (2013) An Archaeology of the Cosmos, Routledge Press.
- (2012) Oxford Handbook of North American Archaeology., ed. by Timothy Pauketat, Oxford University Press
- (2009) Cahokia: Ancient America's Great City on the Mississippi. Viking Adult.
- (2007) Chiefdoms and Other Archaeological Delusions. Alta Mira Press.
- (2004) Ancient Cahokia and the Mississippians. Cambridge University Press.
- (2001) “Practice and History in Archaeology: an Emerging Paradigm", Anthropological Theory Vol. 1, No. 73
- (1998) “Refiguring the Archaeology of Greater Cahokia", Journal of Archaeological Research Vol. 6 No. 1
- (1994) The Ascent of Chiefs: Cahokia and Mississippian Politics in Native North America, University of Alabama Press.

Pauketat, Timothy R. and Alt, Susan M.

- (2005) “Agency in a Postmold? Physicality and the Archaeology of Culture-Making", in Journal of Archaeological Method and Theory, Vol. 12 No. 3
