= Cahokia =

Archaeological site in southwestern Illinois, US

Cahokia Mounds State Historic Site
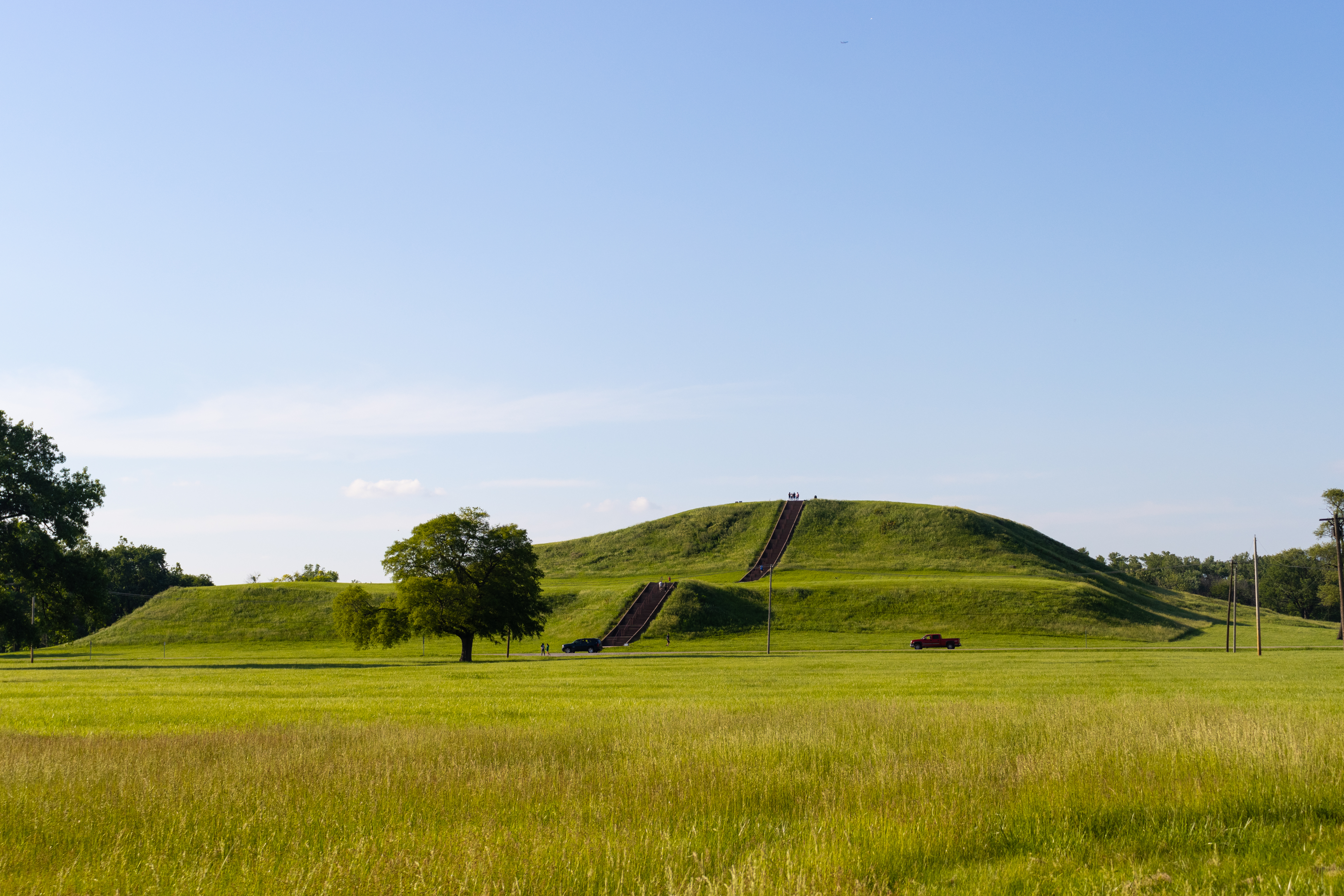
- Monks Mound is the largest earthen structure at Cahokia (for scale, people below and on top). About 80 earthen mounds or earthworks survive at the archeology site out of perhaps as many as 120 at the city's apex.

- Location within the United States
- Location: St. Clair County, Illinois, U.S.
- Nearest city: Collinsville, Illinois
- Coordinates: 38°39′14″N 90°3′52″W
- Area: 2,200 acres (8.9 km^{2})
- Governing body: Illinois Historic Preservation Division

UNESCO World Heritage Site
- Official name: Cahokia Mounds State Historic Site
- Type: Cultural
- Criteria: iii, iv
- Designated: 1982 (6th session)
- Reference no.: 198
- Region: Europe and North America

U.S. National Register of Historic Places
- Official name: Cahokia Mounds
- Designated: October 15, 1966
- Reference no.: 66000899

U.S. National Historic Landmark
- Official name: Cahokia Mounds
- Designated: July 19, 1964

Illinois State Historic Site

The Cahokia Mounds (also simply known as Cahokia /kəˈhoʊkiə/; Smithsonian trinomial ID 11 MS 2) is the site of a Native American city which existed c. 1050 – c. 1350 AD, directly across the Mississippi River from present-day St. Louis. The state archaeology park lies in south-western Illinois between East St. Louis and Collinsville. The park covers 2,200 acres (890 ha; 3.4 mi^{2}; 8.9 km^{2}), and contains about 80 manmade mounds, but the ancient city was much larger. At its apex around 1100 AD, the city covered about 6 square miles (16 km^{2}), included about 120 earthworks in a wide range of sizes, shapes, and functions, and had a population of between 15,000 and 20,000 people. (Note: This population may have been larger than that of Paris and London at the same time.)

Cahokia was the largest and most influential urban settlement of the Mississippian culture, which developed advanced societies across much of what is now the Central and the Southeastern United States, beginning around 1000 AD. Today, the Cahokia Mounds are considered to be the largest and most complex archaeological site north of the great pre-Columbian cities in Mexico.

The city's original name is unknown. The mounds were later named after the Cahokia tribe, a historic Illiniwek people living in the area when the first French explorers arrived in the 17th century. As this was centuries after Cahokia was abandoned by its original inhabitants, the Cahokia tribe was not necessarily descended from the earlier Mississippian-era people. Most likely, multiple indigenous ethnic groups settled in the Cahokia Mounds area during the time of the city's apex.

Cahokia Mounds is a National Historic Landmark and a designated site for state protection. It is also one of the 26 UNESCO World Heritage Sites within the United States. The largest pre-Columbian earthen construction in the Americas north of Mexico, the site is open to the public and administered by the Illinois Historic Preservation Division and supported by the Cahokia Mounds Museum Society. In celebration of the 2018 Illinois state bicentennial, the Cahokia Mounds were selected as one of the Illinois 200 Great Places by the American Institute of Architects Illinois component (AIA Illinois). It was recognized by USA Today Travel magazine, as one of the selections for 'Illinois 25 Must See Places'.

== History ==
=== Historical overview ===
Although some evidence exists of occupation during the Late Archaic period (around 1200 BCE) in and around the site, Cahokia as it is now defined was settled around 600 CE during the Late Woodland period. Mound building at this location began with the emergent Mississippian cultural period, around the 9th century CE. The inhabitants left no written records beyond symbols on pottery, marine shell, copper, wood, and stone, but the evidence of elaborately planned community, woodhenge, mounds, and burials later in time reveal a complex and sophisticated society.

Cahokia became the most important center for the Mississippian culture. This culture was expressed in settlements that ranged along major waterways across what is now the Midwest, Eastern, and Southeastern United States. Cahokia was located in a strategic position near the confluence of the Mississippi, Missouri, and Illinois Rivers. It maintained trade links with communities as far away as the Great Lakes to the north and the Gulf Coast to the south, trading in such exotic items as copper, Mill Creek chert, shark teeth, and lightning whelk shells.

Table	900–1050 CE	1050–1100 CE	1100–1200 CE	1200–1300 CE	1300–1600 CE
Archaeological Chronology	Terminal Late Woodland Period	Lohmann Phase	Stirling Phase	Moorehead Phase	Sand Prairie Phase
Developments	Villages nucleate and grow in size. Eastern Agricultural Crops cultivated. Maize introduced.	Urbanization and non-local contacts increase. Religious rituals and administrative centers appear. Greater Cahokia precincts and upland villages in the Richland Complex settled.	Moundbuilding continues, as does religious administration in the hinterlands. A large conflagration in the East St. Louis precinct circa 1160–1170 CE marks the beginning of depopulation.	Upland villages are depopulated. The entire city's population contracts. Storage pits moved inside residences. Marked change in ceramic styles. Non-local contacts are maintained.	Population continues to decline. The city is abandoned by 1400 CE with brief Oneota reoccupation.
Architectural record	Earliest earthen platforms. Villages organized around central feature as cosmograms.	Woodhenge, T-and-L-shaped structures, large circular and rectangular platform mounds, plazas, and causeways.	Continued construction of mounds. The first iteration of the central palisade is constructed circa 1175 CE.	Select mound construction. Termination of certain structures. Large rotundas and T-and-L-shaped structures are no longer constructed. The palisade is rebuilt.	Any possible small-scale mound construction ceases before 1400 CE.

=== Development (9th and 10th centuries) ===
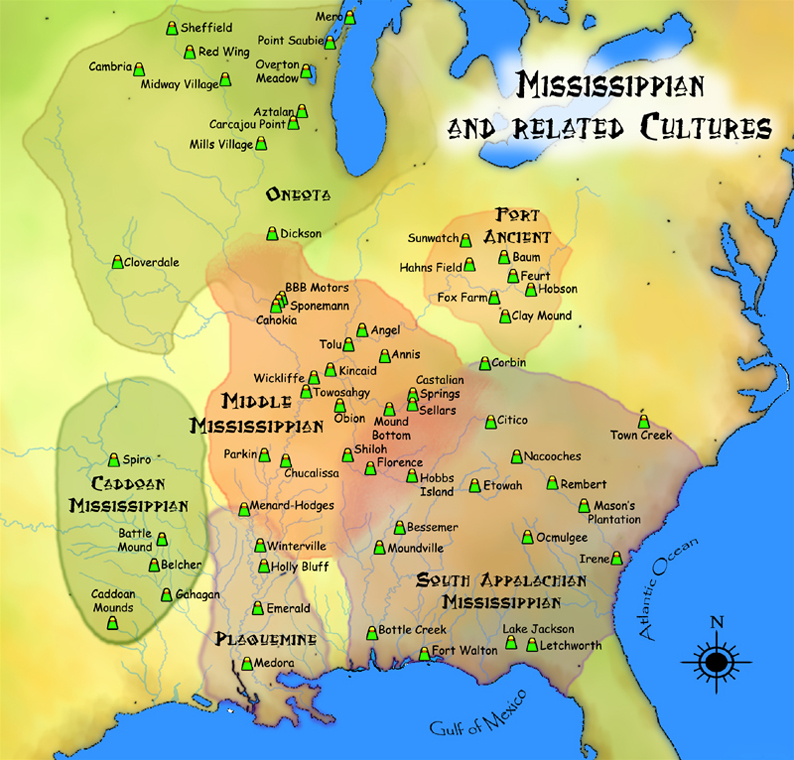
A map showing approximate areas of various Mississippian and related cultures. Cahokia is located near the center of this map in the upper part of the Middle Mississippi area.

In the centuries preceding 1000 CE, American Bottom populations were living in small settlements of 50 to 100 people that were used for short durations of 5–10 years. At least two of these larger clusters were present at Cahokia, one dating to the mid-7th and 9th centuries. Later in time, many began to be constructed along cosmologically organizing principles, emphasizing cardinal directions and distinct sectors of society. By the end of the 10th century, many of these settlements aggregated into larger groups. These larger villages included the earlier cosmogram layouts complete with large central posts, pits, and/or structures.

An extensive nucleated community sprawled across 35–70 hectares (86–173 acres) in Cahokia proper, with its beginnings at the end in the late 900s CE. By this time it seems a few thousand people were living in the American Bottom region. Moundbuilding activity may have occurred at Cahokia proper but certainly did at one site to the north near Horseshoe Lake. These Late Woodland people were farmers but maize's importance at this time was marginal. Its successful introduction occurred around 900 CE. Most of the crops grown at the time were from the Eastern Agricultural Complex suite, an older and endemic farming tradition.

=== Rise and peak (11th and 12th centuries) ===
In the years around 1050 CE, the city-proper's three urban precincts: St. Louis, East St. Louis, and Cahokia were constructed. At the same time, an ordered city grid—oriented to the north along the Grand Plaza, Rattlesnake Causeway, and dozens of mounds—was imposed on earlier Woodland settlements. This was accompanied by a homogenization of material culture (e.g. pottery and architectural styles) that divided the smaller settlements beforehand. Mound construction increased across the region in the 11th century in the floodplain and, for the first time, in the uplands to the east. Some mounds were built on earlier settlement locations—arguably by descendants emphasizing their particular ancestral positions in the new social order. All villages experienced either renewal and construction efforts turning them into mound centers, or were depopulated to become just a few households or a single farmstead. New settlement types including nucleated settlements, mound centers, small dispersed clusters of houses, and single-family farmsteads appeared throughout the region.

The city's complex construction of earthen mounds required digging, excavation and transportation by hand using woven baskets. Construction made use of 55 million cubic feet (1.6 million cubic meters) of earth, and much of the work was accomplished over decades. Its highly planned large, smoothed-flat, ceremonial plazas, sited around the mounds, with homes for thousands connected by laid out pathways and courtyards, suggest the location served as a central religious pilgrimage city.

At the high point of its development, Cahokia was the largest urban center north of the great Mesoamerican cities in Mexico and Central America. Home to about 1,000 people before circa 1050, its population grew rapidly after that date. According to a 2007 study in Quaternary Science Reviews, "Between AD 1050 and 1100, Cahokia's population increased from between 1,400 and 2,800 people to between 10,200 and 15,300 people", an estimate that applies only to a 1.8-square-kilometre (0.69 sq mi) high-density central occupation area. As a result of archeological excavations in the early 21st century, new residential areas were found to the west of Cahokia; this discovery increased estimates of historic area population. Archaeologists estimate the city's population at between 6,000 and 40,000 at its peak. If the highest population estimates are correct, Cahokia was larger than any subsequent city in the United States until the 1780s, when Philadelphia's population grew beyond 40,000. Its population in the 12th century may have been larger than that of London and Paris.

Studies of Cahokia's rise see large-scale immigration as an essential contributor to the city's initial rapid growth. At the onset of the "Big Bang," non-local ceramics begins to appear in higher frequencies across site types indicating interaction or immigration from populations around the lower Ohio Drainage (Yankeetown), Lower Mississippi Valley (Coles Creek), Upper Midwest (below), and south-central plains (Caddo). Many of these immigrants moved into outlying villages in the eastern uplands, referred to as the Richland Complex. Intensive farming and textile production occurred in these villages which has been interpreted as supplicant behavior directed towards the central urban core of the city. The novel practices these immigrant communities brought with them have been argued as essential to the creation of the character of Cahokia as a city. One such example, the common mound-and-plaza pairing, was adopted from longstanding Coles Creek organizational principles.

Contacts across the mid-continent and possibly beyond are attested to have reached a peak between 1050 and 1150 CE. Mill Creek chert from southwestern Illinois, most notably, was used in the production of hoes, a high demand tool for farmers around Cahokia and other Mississippian centers. Cahokia's loose control over distribution, though not production, of these tools was important in emphasizing a new agricultural regime. Mississippian culture pottery and stone tools in the Cahokian style were found at the Silvernale site near Red Wing, Minnesota, and materials and trade goods from Pennsylvania, the Gulf Coast, and Lake Superior have been excavated at Cahokia. Cahokians traveled down to the Carson site in Coahoma County, Mississippi and built a settlement during the 12th century. Others paddled upriver to the site of Trempleau Bluffs in southern Wisconsin, to create a mounded religious center at the end of the 11th century.

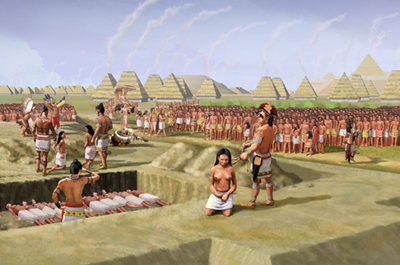
A human sacrifice of fifty-three women at Cahokia

It was during the Stirling phase (1100–1200 CE) that Cahokia was at its height of political centralization. Current academic discourse has emphasized religion as a major component in consolidating and maintaining the political power essential to Cahokia's urbanity. The Emerald Acropolis mound site in the uplands, was a site where the moon, water, femininity, and fertility were venerated; the mounds were aligned to lunar events in its 18.6 year cycle. Immigrant ceramics early in the archaeological record argue that it was central in attracting immigrants as pilgrims. Political control was exercised in the Cahokian hinterlands at distinctive temple complexes consisting of T or L shaped structures and sweatlodges. Distinctive rituals have archaeologically documented at these complexes involving tobacco, red cedar, agricultural produce, and female Cahokian flint clay figurines. Intense public rituals, like the sacrifice of dozens of women at mound 72 and interment of powerful leaders in ridge top mortuary mounds, integrated populations in shared experiences and narratives of their world during the 11th and 12th centuries.

One of the major problems that large centers like Cahokia faced was keeping a steady supply of food, perhaps exacerbated by droughts from CE 1100–1250. A related problem was waste disposal for the dense population, and Cahokia is believed to have become unhealthy from polluted waterways. Because it was such an unhealthy place to live, Snow believes that the town had to rely on social and political attractions to bring in a steady supply of new immigrants; otherwise, the town's death rate would have caused it to be abandoned earlier.

=== Decline (13th and 14th centuries) ===
By the end of the 12th century, two distinct events marked the beginning of Cahokia's rearticulation and decline. Circa 1160–1170 CE. a large walled residential compound in the East St. Louis precinct was burned down. Multiple ritual structures that were filled with an unusual density of stone tools, exotic materials, and pots filled with shelled maize were included in this burning. The event possibly represented unrest in response to 12th century inequalities. The same area was later rebuilt but not for residential purposes. In the same general timeframe around 1175 CE, people constructed the first iteration of the large central palisade around Cahokia's core. People began leaving the city in larger numbers beginning in the late 12th century. In the middle of the succeeding 13th century, Cahokia's population had decreased by half if not more, and by 1350 CE the city was abandoned.

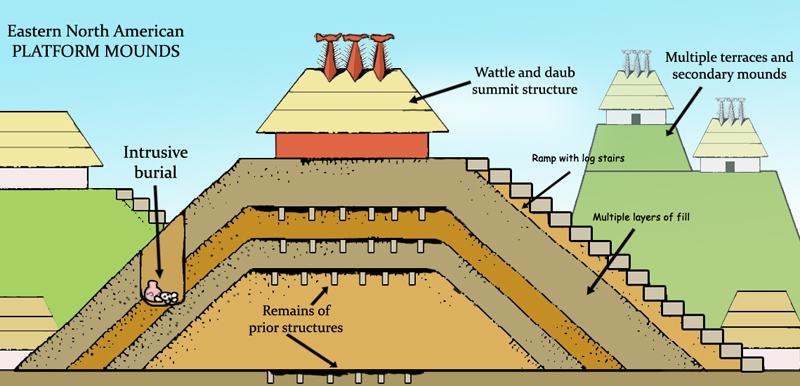
Mississippian period showing the multiple layers of mound construction, mound structures such as temples or mortuaries, ramps with log stairs, and prior structures under later layers, multiple terraces, and intrusive burials

Scholars have proposed environmental factors, such as environmental degradation through overhunting, deforestation and pollution, and climatic changes, such as increased flooding and droughts, as explanations for abandonment of the site. However, more recent research suggests that there is no evidence of human-caused erosion or flooding at Cahokia.

The late 12th century into the turn of the 13th (the Moorehead phase, 1200–1300 CE) was one of change. People stopped constructing and using the earlier T and L shaped ritual buildings as well as large circular rotundas. Family homes were built larger and storage pits previously located outside of them were moved inside. Ceramic styles and production techniques shifted with an increase in plates, cord-marking, and solar-themed iconography. There was also an increase in cemeteries of grouped minor-elites outside of Cahokia. Though mound construction still occurred, it did so at a lesser rate. Many earlier mounds were ritually capped and ceased to be modified afterwards. Altogether, this has been taken as a time when centralized political structures were weakening and religious practices thought essential were re-evaluated.

Political, economic, or cultural problems may also have contributed to the community's decline. Thomas Emerson and Kristin Hedman argue that Cahokia's large immigrant population was a factor in the city's ultimate fragmentation, as differing languages, customs, and religions obstructed the creation of a cohesive Cahokian cultural identity. Analyses of Cahokian burial sites and the associated remains have also shown that many Cahokians were not native to the city or its immediate surrounding region. These immigrants were sometimes buried separately from native residents, a possible indicator of weak integration along ethnic lines. It is likely that social and environmental factors combined to produce the conditions that led people to leave Cahokia.

Cahokia's connections to the surrounding regions seems to have shifted from one of direct contact and outpost construction to one of dispersal. The immigrant populations inhabiting upland villages in the so-called Richland Complex were some of the first to leave the city. Many people leaving Cahokia went south into the Cairo Lowlands of southern Illinois and further south in the Central Mississippi Valley. Later, some left for The Cumberland Basin in central Tennessee. Finely crafted artifacts from Cahokia, such as copper repoussé plates and engraved shell, appear in powerful polities such as Moundville and Etowah only after 1250 CE.

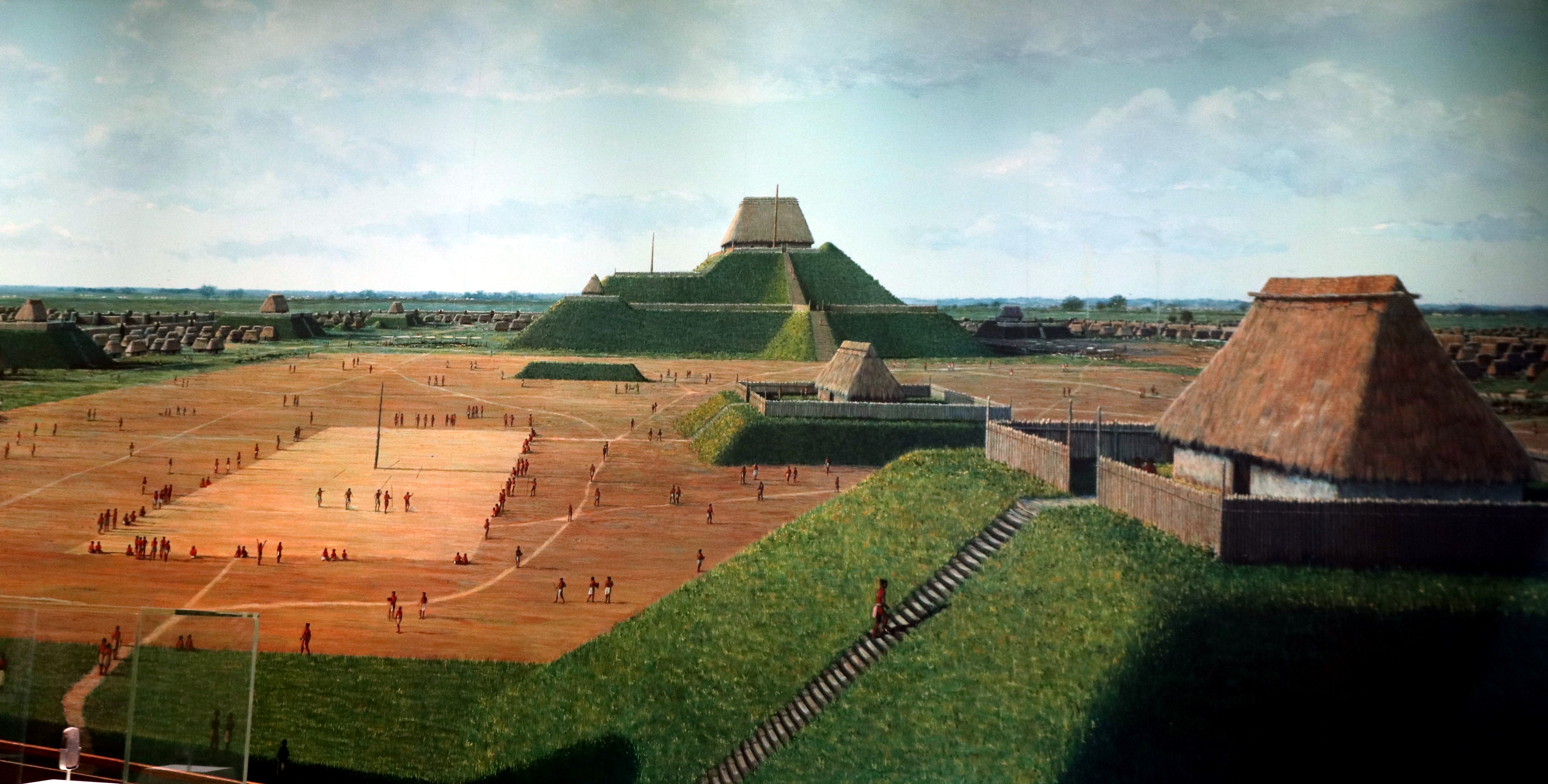
Illustration of the central plaza at Cahokia as it may have looked at its peak 1050–1350 AD

Another possible cause is invasion by outside peoples. Many theories since the late 20th century propose conquest-induced political collapse as the primary reason for Cahokia's abandonment. Evidence of warfare found is defensive wooden stockade and watchtowers that enclosed Cahokia's main ceremonial precinct. Multiple associated 13th century burned villages in the Illinois River Valley to the north speak to the rising tensions at the time. Palisades become popular across parts of the Midwest and mid-South during the 13th century as communities begin living together in much more nucleated settlement types. However, Cahokia's palisade may have been more for ritual or formal separation than for military purposes, but bastioned palisades almost always indicate warfare. As Cahokia's population shrank over the 13th century, Cahokia's palisade was rebuilt several times to encompass increasingly-smaller portions of the city.

Diseases transmitted among the large, dense urban population are another possible cause of decline. Similarly, health issues like pellagra are known to arise through maize-intense diets like Cahokia's. However, evidence tying nutritional deficiencies to a broader societal collapse has not been conclusively identified. At Cahokia's beginning around CE 1050, hominy was made though nixtamalization that made the maize more nutritious. Recent research indicates that early Cahokians nixtamalized maize but then stopped nixtamalizing maize around CE 1200. Intense reliance on maize that is not nixtamalized may result in pellagra and death. Isotope analysis of burial remains at Cahokia has revealed iron-deficiency anemia and tooth enamel defects potentially stemming from Cahokia's reliance on un-nixtamalized maize.

Together with these factors, researchers found evidence in 2015 of major floods at Cahokia, so severe as to flood dwelling places. Analysis of sediment from beneath Horseshoe Lake has revealed that two major floods occurred in the period of settlement at Cahokia, in roughly 1100–1260 and 1340–1460. While flooding may have occurred early in the rise of the city, it seems not to have deterred the city builders; to the contrary, it appears they took steps such as creating channels, dikes, and levees that protected at least the central city throughout its inhabited history. In another indication of flood mitigation efforts, Cahokians dispersed their agricultural lands among both lowland and upland fields, thereby reducing the chances that a single cataclysmic flood would wipe out the city's food supply.

=== Abandonment and resettling (15th through 19th centuries) ===
Cahokia's abandonment came in tandem with the abandonment of the wider surrounding region, referred to by scholars as "the Vacant Quarter." Populations left what is now southern Illinois; the Lower Ohio Drainage in southern Indiana; nearly the entirety of western Kentucky and Tennessee; most of southeastern Missouri excepting the Bootheel; and the Upper Tombigbee drainage in northeastern Mississippi. The region may have been used by occasional hunting parties but there was no settlement of any substantial kind at Cahokia, nor in the wider region, from 1400 to 1600 CE. However archeologists discovered evidence in 2020 that there was a population rebound in the greater area following Cahokia's population minimum in 1400, with the population reaching a population maximum in 1650 and then declining again in 1700.

Dhegiha Siouan migration was in part responsible for the depopulation of Cahokia. The city is the heritage of many contemporary Native American communities, the former group in particular. Ponca oral tradition specifies their ancestors' time in Cahokia, calling the city or its location "P’ahé’žíde" [red hill]. Following the city's abandonment as such, Algonquian groups from the east moved into the Vacant Quarter in the mid-17th century, specifically those of the Illinois Confederation. The Cahokia tribe was one such group and from whom the site gets its name.

While Cahokia proper had ceased to exist, the mounds continued to be present on the landscape. Various French settler-colonial families are documented to have claimed the land of the city during the 18th century. St. Louis was defined by the mounds that Cahokians had constructed across the river, referred to at one point as "Mound City." Nearly all these mounds in Downtown St. Louis were destroyed and used for fill in the growing city's construction in the mid-19th century. As Native Americans were forcibly removed from the land through treaties and war (particularly the Black Hawk's War), their claim to the land and its usage was usurped. In downtown Cahokia a group of early 19th century (circa 1809) Trappist Monks lived on the grounds. Later the land was farmed by the Ramey family through the latter-half of the 19th century. This is when serious archaeological interest began as Euro-American settlers began trying to make sense of the site.

== Contemporary usage (post 19th-century) ==
=== Descendant communities ===
Cahokia: State Names Map (2023) by Jaune Quick-To-See Smith illustrating the contemporary, far-reaching relationships Cahokia has with Native American groups and places.

As one of the most impactful cities in the history of the North American continent, Cahokia's reach has been extensive. Many Native American peoples and tribes recognize the site today as being important to their heritage. The Osage Nation is a primary collaborator with archaeologists and site management. One of the only remaining Mississippian mounds across the river in St. Louis, Sugarloaf Mound, was purchased by the nation to care for it in posterity.

Many Indigenous people groups and nations including the Cherokee, Choctaw, Chickasaw, and Muscogee-Creek, carry on their moundbuilding traditions similar to those of Cahokia. Native American people continue to venerate the site as sacred, coming to the grounds to perform ceremony and dance. The site has served as inspiration for much Native American art. Notably Howard Revard, an esteemed poet and member of Osage Nation, wrote about the site in Winning the Dust Bowl. Artist Jaune Quick-to-See Smith, a member of the Confederated Salish and Kootenai Tribes, displayed the works, "State Names Map: Cahokia" and "Trade Canoe: Cahokia", both inspired by the site, as part of an exhibit at St. Louis Art Museum.

=== Cahokia Museum and Interpretive Center ===
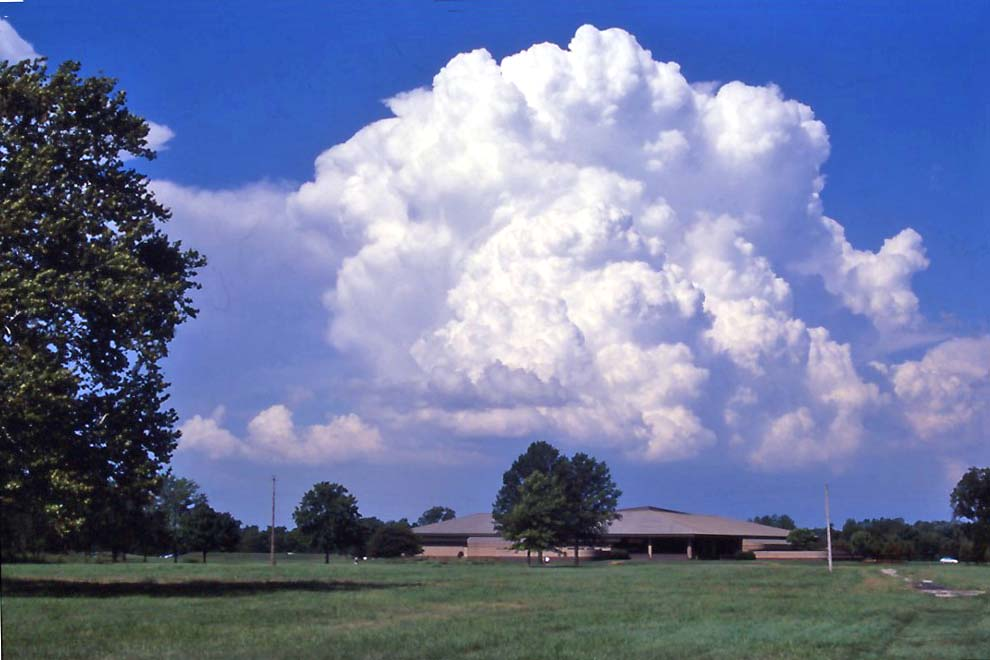
Museum and Interpretive Center

The Cahokia Museum and Interpretive Center, which receives up to a million visitors a year, was designed by AAIC Inc. The building, which opened in 1989, received the Thomas H. Madigan Award, the St. Louis Construction News & Reviews Readers Choice Award, the Merit Award from the Metal Construction Association, and the Outstanding Achievement Award from the Brick Manufacturer Association.

=== Academia ===
Cahokia has long been a point of interest in the academic community. As early as the 1960s, universities across the Midwest have gone to the site to conduct research in fields ranging from geology to archaeology. One of the most prominent archaeological researchers of Cahokia is Timothy Pauketat. He has been writing about and researching Cahokia for the majority of his professional career. Other prominent Cahokia academics include Warren Wittry, who was instrumental in the recovery of Cahokia Woodhenge.

=== Designations ===
Cahokia Mounds was first protected by the state of Illinois in 1923 when its legislature authorized purchase of a state park. Later designation as a state historic site offered additional protection, but the site came under significant threat from the federal highway building program in the 1950s. The highway program reduced the site's integrity; however, it increased funding for emergency archeological investigations. These investigations became intensive, and today continue. They have resulted in the present understanding of the national and international significance of the site. The site was designated a National Historic Landmark on July 19, 1964, and listed on the National Register of Historic Places on October 15, 1966.

In 1982, UNESCO (the United Nations Educational, Scientific and Cultural Organization) designated the site a World Heritage Site. This is the only such self-contained site in Illinois and among 24 World Heritage Sites in the United States in 2009.

State Senator Evelyn M. Bowles wrote about the Cahokia Mounds site:

Through the years my friends and I made occasional Sunday afternoon trips to the Mounds. When I became the State Senator, it afforded me the opportunity to secure funds for the acquisition of additional acreage in which there are smaller Mounds. Many of these have contained additional artifacts.

The designation has helped protect the property and attract funds to conduct research on this significant civilization.

== Agriculture ==
Cahokia was surrounded by rich agricultural lands. The city has been traditionally thought to have been a maize-centric civilization, the crop having been introduced to the region around AD 900. While maize is often credited with enabling Cahokia's early population growth, more recent research has suggested that Cahokian diets were quite varied, especially in the city's early period of existence. A diversity of crops, such as goosefoot and sumpweed from the Eastern Agricultural Complex, were grown and eaten at Cahokia. Thomas Emerson and Kristin Hedman attribute the discovery of Cahokian individuals with low-maize diets to the existence of hunter-gatherer immigrant communities who had not yet adopted maize as a staple food source.

Residents of outlying areas relied heavily on maize for subsistence, while residents of Cahokia's city center enjoyed more diverse diets. One interpretation is that higher levels of maize consumption may be correlated with a lower social status among Cahokian residents.

The impact that Cahokian agriculture had on the environment, and its relationship to the city's ultimate collapse, is hotly debated. The depletion of farming soil surrounding Cahokia may have led to a decline in food resources that doomed the city. Jane Mt. Pleasant, however, argues that these models of Cahokia's soil longevity are flawed, because it is based on modern understandings of crop yields that assume the use of plows. Cahokians' exclusive use of hand tools was less damaging to the soil and thus may have maintained soil quality far longer than is typical today, making a rapid collapse of agricultural productivity in Cahokia less likely.

Historian Daniel Richter notes that the apex of the city occurred during the Medieval Warming Period. This period appears to have fostered an agricultural revolution in upper North America, as the three-fold crops of maize, beans (legumes), and gourds (squash) were developed and adapted or bred to the temperate climates of the north from their origins in Mesoamerica. Richter also notes that Cahokia's advanced development coincided with the development in the Southwest of the Chaco Canyon society, which also produced large-scale works in an apparent socially stratified society. The decline of the city coincides with the Little Ice Age, although by then, the three-fold agriculture remained well-established throughout temperate North America.

== Notable features ==
The original site contained 120 earthen mounds over an area of 6 square miles (16 km^{2}), of which 80 remain today. To achieve that, thousands of workers over decades moved more than an estimated 55 million cubic feet (1,600,000 m^{3}) of earth in woven baskets to create this network of mounds and community plazas. Monks Mound, for example, covers 14 acres (5.7 ha), rises 100 ft (30 m), and was topped by a massive 5,000 ft^{2} (460 m^{2}) building another 50 ft (15 m) high.

=== Urban landscape ===
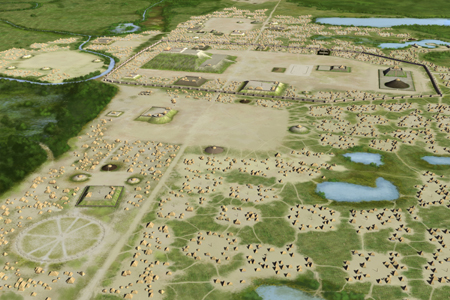
Artist's recreation of central Cahokia. Cahokia's east–west baseline transects the Woodhenge, Monk's Mound, and several other large mounds.

Early in its history, Cahokia underwent a massive construction boom. Along with the early phase of Monks Mound, an overarching urban layout was established at the site. It was built with a symbolic quadripartite worldview and oriented toward the four cardinal directions with the main east–west and north–south axes defined with Monks Mound near its center point. Four large plazas were established to the east, west, north, and south of Monks Mound.

To the south of Monks Mound is the Grand Plaza, a large area that covered roughly 50 acres (20 ha) and measured over 1,600 ft (490 m) in length by over 900 ft (270 m) in width. Researchers originally thought the flat, open terrain in this area reflected Cahokia's location on the Mississippi's alluvial flood plain, but instead soil studies have shown that the landscape was originally undulating ridge and swale topography. In one of the earliest large-scale construction projects, the site had been expertly and deliberately leveled and filled by the city's inhabitants. It is part of the sophisticated engineering displayed throughout the site. It was used for large ceremonies and gatherings, as well as for ritual games, such as chunkey. The game was played by rolling a disc-shaped chunky stone across the field. The players would throw spears where they thought the chunky stone would land. The game required a great deal of judgment and aim.

The major ceremonial north–south 'axis' connects the main precinct with the large ridgetop mortuary mound to its south now known as the Rattlesnake Mound (Mound 66). The feature, named the Rattlesnake Causeway by archaeologists, was an elevated embankment about 18 metres (59 ft) wide, roughly 800 metres (2,600 ft) in length and varies in height from 0.5 metres (1.6 ft) to almost 1.3 metres (4.3 ft) as it traverses a low swampy area to the south of the Grand Plaza. It is aligned 5° east of north, a direction thought to mimic the maximum southern moon rise of 5° west of north, albeit in reverse. This is thought to have had symbolic associations to the builders in connection with their lunar maize goddess of the underworld. This is further strengthened by its close proximity to the ridgetop mortuary Mound 72, the underworld connotations of the low water-filled area the causeway traversed, and its terminus at the mortuary complex at the Rattlesnake Mound. The causeway itself may have been seen as a symbolic "Path of Souls".

The high-status central district of Cahokia was surrounded by a 2-mile-long (3.2 km) palisade that was equipped with protective bastions. A later addition to the site, when the palisade was constructed, it cut through and separated some pre-existing neighborhoods. Archaeologists found evidence of the stockade during excavation of the area and indications that it was rebuilt several times. Its bastions showed that it was mainly built for defensive purposes.

Beyond Monks Mound, as many as 120 more mounds stood at varying distances from the city center. To date, 109 mounds have been located, 68 of which are in the park area. The mounds are divided into three different types: platform, conical, and ridge-top. Each appeared to have had its own meaning and function. In general terms, the city center seems to have been laid out in a diamond-shaped pattern about 1 mi (1.6 km) from end to end, while the entire city is 5 mi (8.0 km) across from east to west.

=== Domestic architecture ===
Cahokian residential zones were arranged into carefully planned clusters around plazas and mounds. Specific delineations and functions have been hard to determine, but many of these clusters may have been designed to accommodate religious or ethnic segregations. Cahokia's neighborhoods possessed a standardized suite of building types, including steam baths, council houses, and temples.

Cahokian domestic structures were generally of pole-and-thatch construction and followed rectangular footprints. Wall trenches were often used instead of posts for building construction.

Alleen Betzenhauser and Timothy Pauketat argue that upwards of 20 percent of Cahokia's neighborhood structures did not serve domestic functions, but were rather intended to facilitate engagement with non-human spiritual beings as part of an animistic religion. These beings may have resided in the building itself or inhabited large marker posts, similar to the posts used to build the Cahokia Woodhenge. Betzenhauser and Pauketat compare their theorized Cahokian buildings to similar historical examples such as shaking tents or medicine lodges.

=== Monks Mound ===
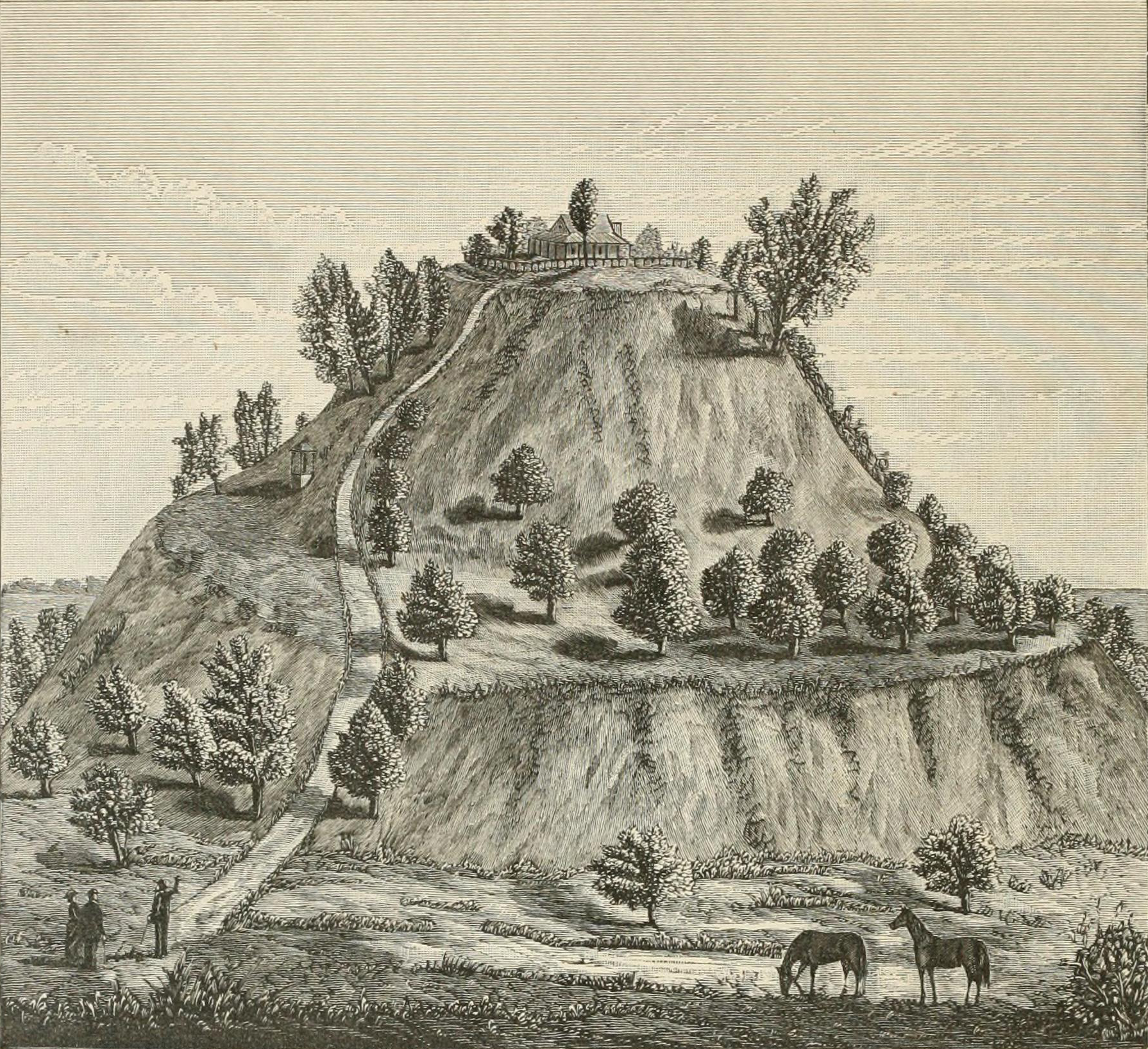
An 1882 illustration of Monks Mound showing it with fanciful proportions

Monks Mound is the largest structure and central focus of the city: a massive platform mound with four terraces, 10 stories tall, it is the largest man-made earthen mound north of Mexico. Facing south, it is 100 ft (30 m) high, 951 ft (290 m) long, 836 ft (255 m) wide and covers 13.8 acres (5.6 ha). It contains about 814,000 yd^{3} (622,000 m^{3}) of earth. The mound was built higher and wider over the course of several centuries, through as many as 10 separate construction episodes, as the mound was built taller and the terraces and apron were added.

Monks Mounds was named for the community of Trappist monks who resided there for a short time, after Euroamericans settled in the area. Excavation on the top of Monks Mound has revealed evidence of a large building, likely a temple or the residence of the paramount chief, which would have been seen throughout the city. This building was about 105 ft (32 m) long and 48 feet (15 m) wide, and could have been as much as 50 ft (15 m) high. It was about 5,000 ft^{2} (460 m^{2}).

The east and northwest sides of Monks Mound were twice excavated in August 2007 during an attempt to avoid erosion due to slumping. These areas were repaired to preserve the mound.

=== Mound 72 ===
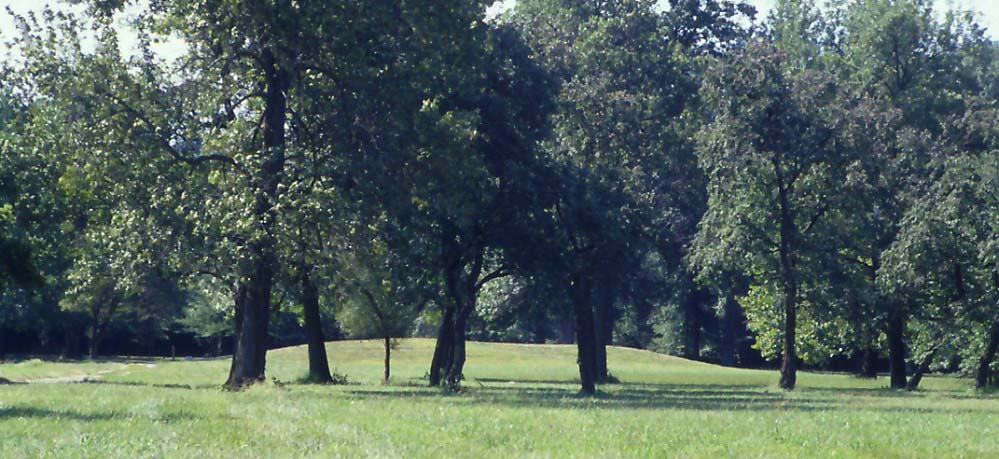
Mound 72

During excavation of Mound 72, a ridge-top burial mound south of main urban precinct, archaeologists found the remains of about 270 individuals, including paired male/female burials. One burial (Feature 101) was buried on a bed of 10,000 marine-shell disc beads arranged in the shape of a falcon, with the bird's head appearing beneath and beside the man's head, and its wings and tail beneath his arms and legs. This burial is known as the Beaded Burial or Birdman. Other burials, such as the Exotic Cache Burial in the mound had exotic materials and huge quantities of shell beads.

The falcon warrior or "birdman" is a common motif in Mississippian culture. This burial clearly had powerful iconographic significance. In addition, a cache of sophisticated, finely worked arrowheads in a variety of different styles and materials was found near the grave of this important man. Separated into four types, each from a different geographical region, the arrowheads demonstrated Cahokia's extensive trade links in North America.

Archeologists recovered more than 250 other skeletons from Mound 72. Scholars believe almost 62% of these were sacrificial victims, based on signs of ritual execution, method of burial, and other factors. The skeletons include:

- Four young males, missing their hands and skulls
- A mass grave of more than 50 women around 21 years old, with the bodies arranged in two layers separated by matting
- A mass burial containing 40 men and women who appear to have been violently killed, some of these may have been buried alive: "From the vertical position of some of the fingers, which appear to have been digging in the sand, it is apparent that not all of the victims were dead when they were interred – that some had been trying to pull themselves out of the mass of bodies."

The relationship of these burials to the central burial is unclear. They were unlikely to have all deposited at the same time. Wood in several parts of the mound has been radiocarbon-dated to between 950 and 1000 CE.

Excavations have indicated that Mound 72 was not constructed as a single mound, but rather as a series of smaller mounds. These mounds were reshaped and covered over to give Mound 72 its final ridge-top shape.

=== Copper workshop ===
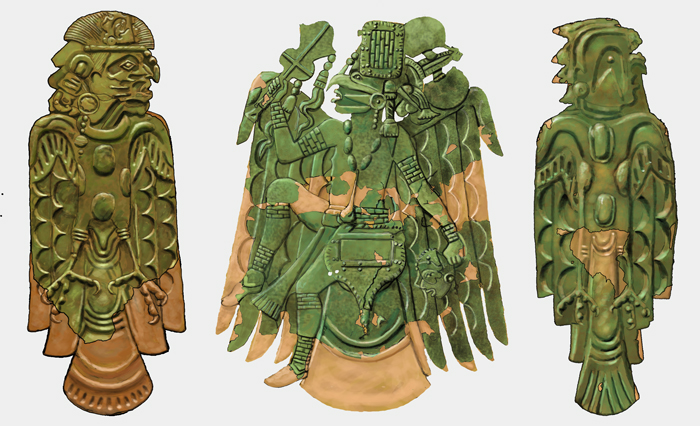
Mississippian culture repoussé copper plates

Excavations near Mound 34 from 2002 to 2010 revealed a copper workshop. This unique find was originally discovered in the 1950s by archaeologist Gregory Perino, but its exact location was lost for 60 years. It is the only known copper workshop to be found at a Mississippian culture site. The area contains the remains of three tree stumps thought to have been used to hold anvil stones. Analysis of copper found during excavations showed that it had been annealed, a technique involving repeatedly heating and cooling the metal as it is worked, as blacksmiths do with iron.

Artisans produced religious items, such as long-nosed god maskettes, ceremonial earrings with a symbolic shape, thought to have been used in fictive kinship rituals. Many of the stylistically related Mississippian copper plates, such as the Wulfing cache from southeastern Missouri, some of the Etowah plates from Georgia, and many of the Spiro plates from Oklahoma, are associated with the Greater Braden style and are thought to have been made in Cahokia in the 13th century.

=== Cahokia Woodhenge ===
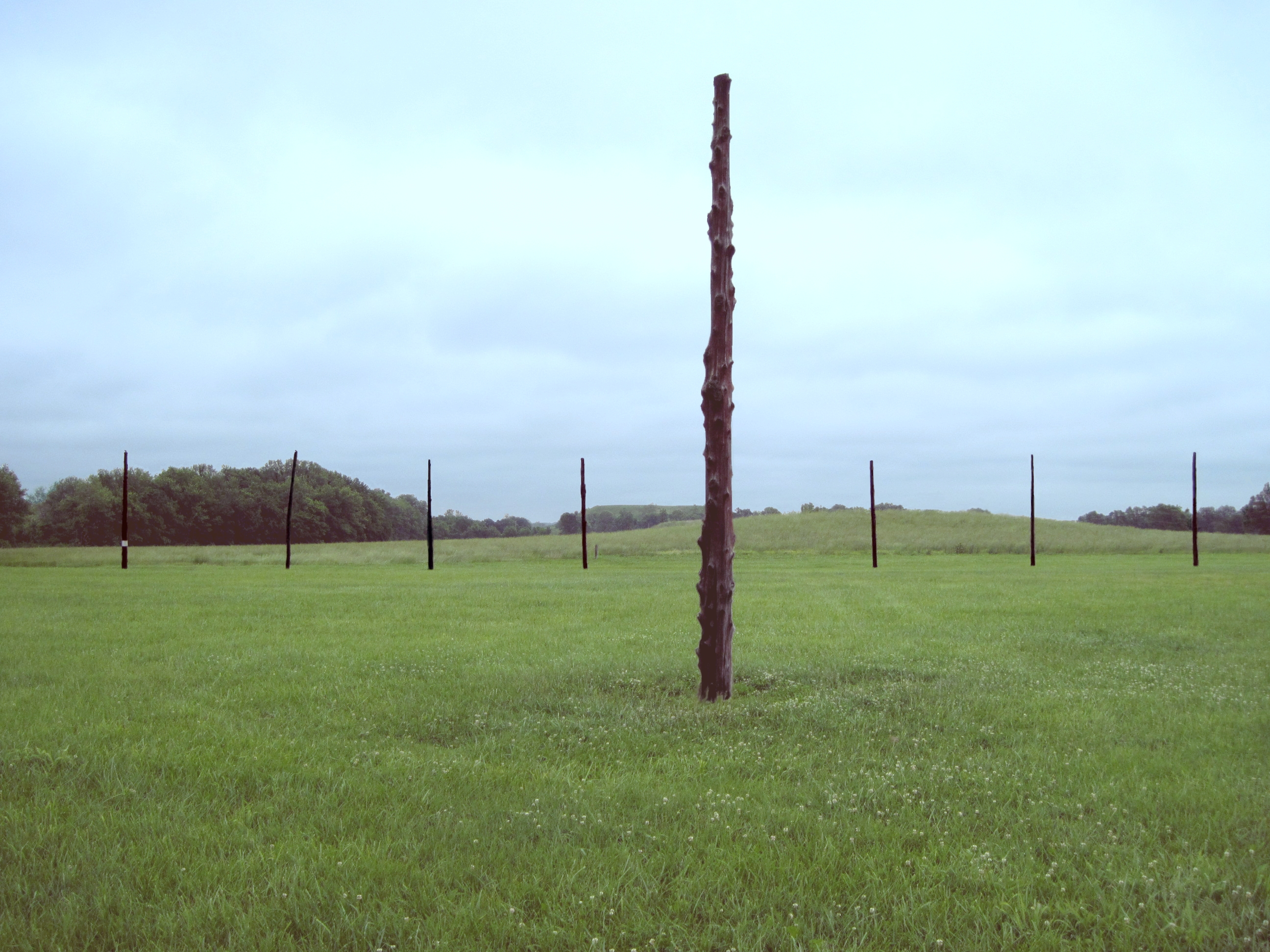
View of the reconstructed Woodhenge III and its alignment with the equinox pole and Monks Mound 0.5 miles (0.8 km) away

The Cahokia Woodhenge was a series of large timber circles located roughly 850 m (2,790 ft) to the west of Monks Mound. They are thought to have been constructed between 900 and 1100 CE, with each one being larger and having 12 more posts than its predecessor. The site was discovered during salvage archaeology undertaken by Dr. Warren Wittry in the early 1960s interstate highway construction boom. Although the majority of the site contained village house features, a number of unusually shaped, large post holes were also discovered. When the holes were plotted out, they formed several arcs of equally spaced holes. Detailed analytical work supported the hypothesis that the placement of these posts was by design, and Wittry hypothesized that the arcs could be whole circles. He began referring to the circles as "woodhenges", comparing the structures to England's well-known circles at Woodhenge and Stonehenge.

The post holes found by Wittry are an example of how soil retains the memory of organic materials that decayed in the soil from thousands of years ago. Many soils have a naturally acidic component that breaks down most organic material pretty quickly, but leaves behind dark discoloration in the soil. The original posts of Cahokia Woodhenge left behind this same discoloration, allowing researchers to easily identify the soil as having once contained wooden posts.

Additional excavations in the 1960s–1980s used predictions based on verified posthole locations and spacing to locate other postholes and confirm the existence of five separate timber circles in the general vicinity. The circles are now designated Woodhenges I through V in Roman numerals. In 1985, a reconstruction of Woodhenge III was built with the posts being placed into the original excavated post positions. The circle, which has 48 posts in the circle and a 49th central post, has been used to investigate archaeoastronomy at Cahokia. The Illinois Historic Preservation Division that oversees the Cahokia site hosts public sunrise observations at the vernal and autumnal equinoxes and the winter and summer solstices. Out of respect for Native American beliefs, these events do not feature ceremonies or rituals of any kind.

== Greater Cahokia ==
Cahokia is recognized as one of the centers of a densely populated collections of sites including East St. Louis, St. Louis Mounds, Janey B. Goode, and the Mitchell site. This region of sites is often referred to as "Greater Cahokia" because they were all inter-related.

== Related mounds ==
Until the 19th century, a series of similar mounds was documented as existing in what is now the city of St. Louis, some 8 mi (13 km) to the west of Cahokia. Most of these mounds were leveled during the development of St. Louis, and much of their material was reused in construction projects.

One survivor of these mounds is Sugarloaf Mound. Located on the west bank of the Mississippi, it marked the initial border between St. Louis and the once autonomous city of Carondelet. The basal remnant of another likely related mound is located in O'Fallon Park in St. Louis.

One of the largest Mississippian sites is Kincaid Mounds State Historic Site, located in Massac and Polk counties in southern Illinois. It is 140 mi (230 km) southeast of Cahokia, located in the floodplain of the Ohio River. With a total of 19 mounds at the complex, it is considered the fifth-largest Mississippian site in terms of the number of monuments. It is believed to have been a chiefdom. The site is designated as a National Historic Landmark.

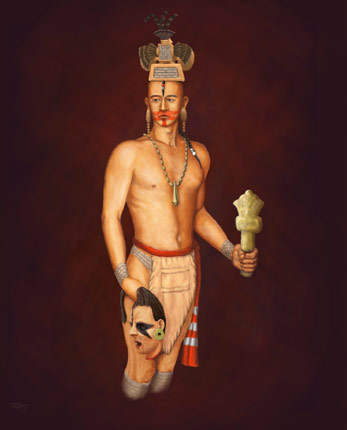
A Mississippian-era priest, in the 13th century, Cahokia metropolis, holding a ceremonial flint mace and severed sacrificial head

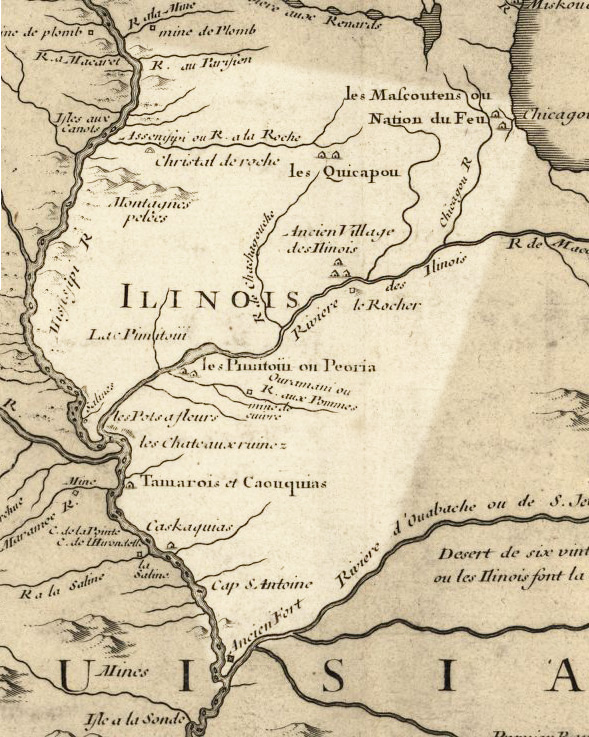
Tamarois et Caouquias on a French map of Illinois in 1718, south of the confluence of the Illinois and Mississippi rivers (approximate modern state area highlighted) from Carte de la Louisiane et du Cours du Mississipi by Guillaume de L'Isle

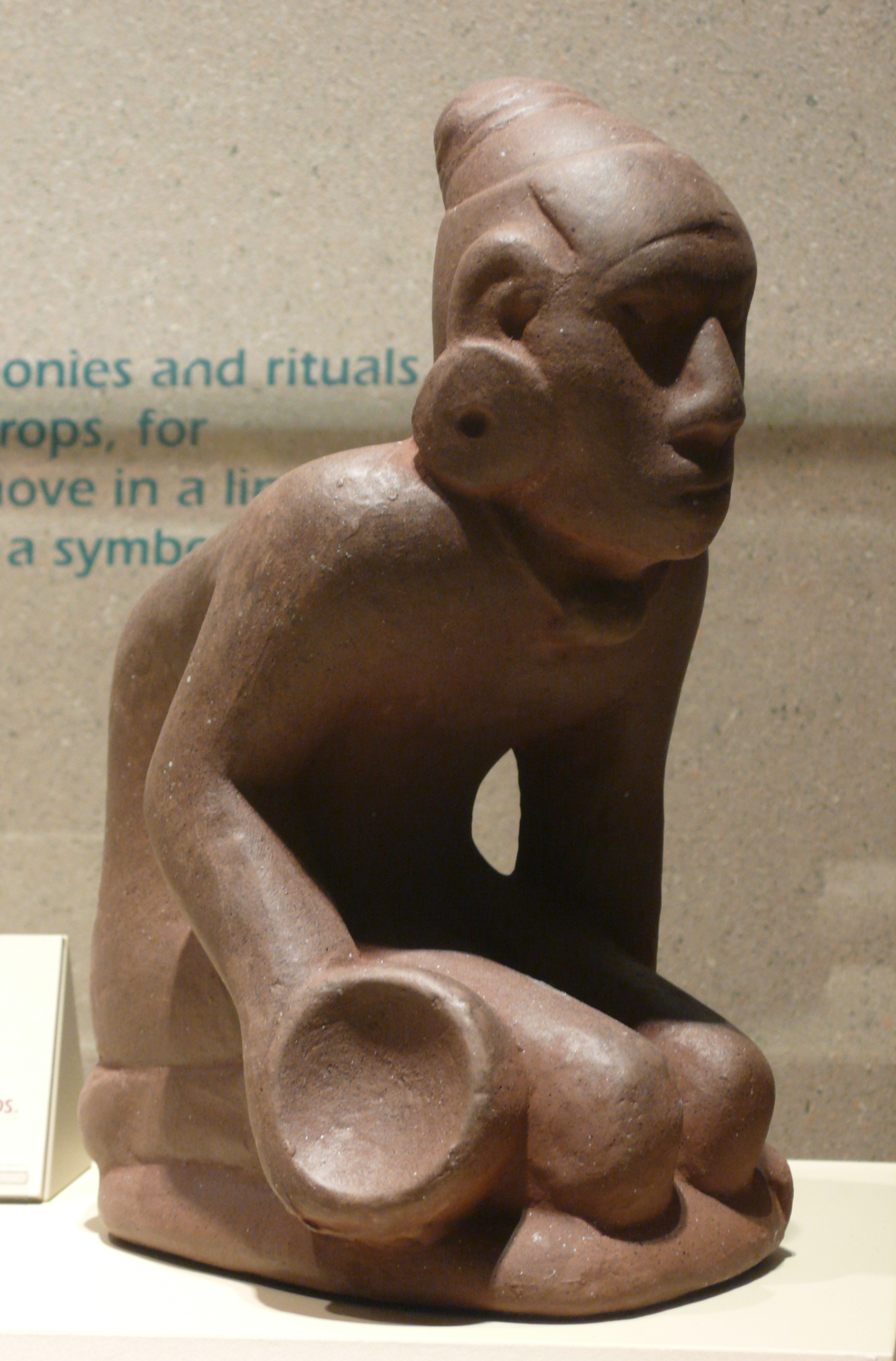
The "Chunkey Player" statuette, made of Missouri flint clay, depicts the ancient Native American game of chunkey. Believed to have been originally crafted at or near Cahokia Mounds, it was found at a Mississippian site in Muskogee County, Oklahoma.

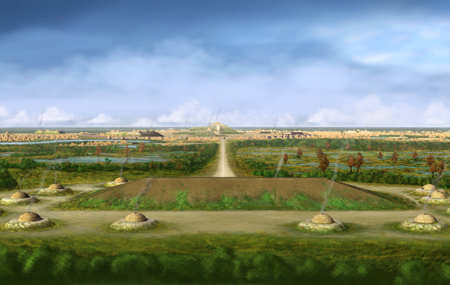
The Rattlesnake Causeway leading from Monks Mound to Mound 66 is the city's ceremonial north–south axis.

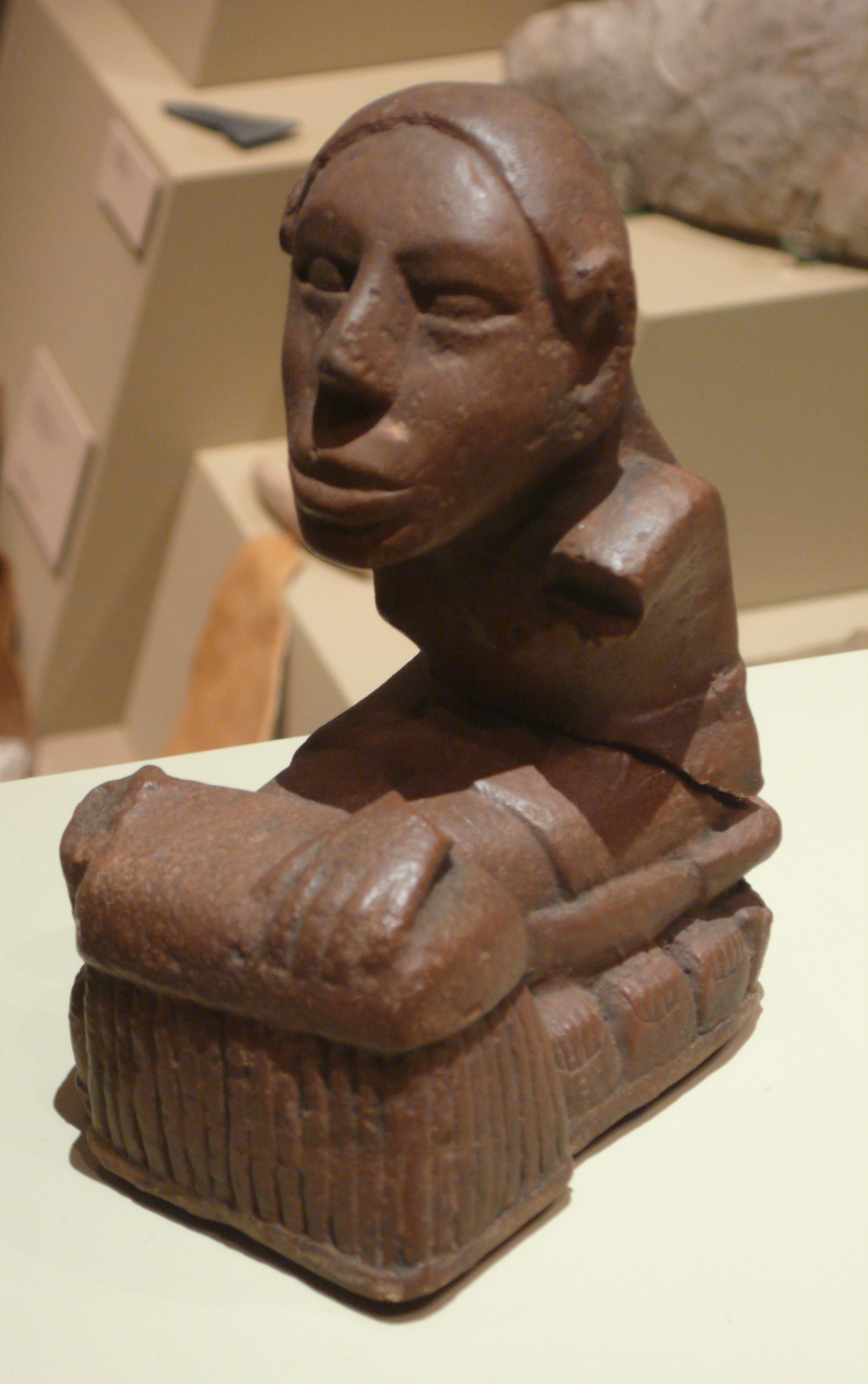
Clay statuette excavated at Cahokia site

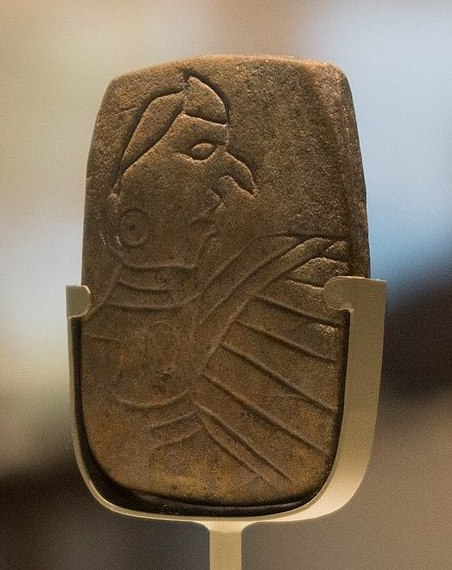
Incised sandstone tablet of a Birdman found in 1971 during excavations into the east side of Monks Mound

== See also ==
- American Bottom
- Hopewell tradition
- Mississippian culture
- Cahokia Jazz, a 2023 alternate history novel
- List of Mississippian sites
- Mississippian Ideological Interaction Sphere
- Mississippian stone statuary
- Poverty Point – UNESCO-designated mound complex in Louisiana
- Hopewell Ceremonial Earthworks – UNESCO-designated mound complex in Ohio
- List of archaeoastronomical sites by country
- List of World Heritage Sites in the United States

== Bibliography ==
- Bolfing, Christopher (May 2010). The Paradigm of the Periphery in Native North America (Undergraduate honors thesis). Texas State University–San Marcos. pp. 67–68. hdl:10877/3288. Archived from the original on March 4, 2012.
- Chappell, Sally A. Kitt (2002). Cahokia: Mirror of the Cosmos. Chicago: University of Chicago Press. ISBN 978-0-226-10136-1.
- Emerson, Thomas E. (1997). Cahokia and the Archaeology of Power. Tuscaloosa, AL: University of Alabama. ISBN 0-8173-0888-1. Archived from the original on February 24, 2007.
- Emerson, Thomas E.; Lewis, R. Barry (1991). Cahokia and the Hinterlands: Middle Mississippian Cultures of the Midwest. Urbana, Illinois: University of Illinois. ISBN 0-252-06878-5. Archived from the original on September 5, 2006.
- Kelly, John E.; Brown, James A.; Hamlin, Jenn M.; Kelly, Lucretia S.; Kozuch, Laura; Parker, Kathryn; Van Nest, Julieann (August 26, 2007). "Mound 34 : The Context for the Early Evidence of the Southeastern Ceremonial Complex at Cahokia". In King, Adam (ed.). Southeastern Ceremonial Complex: Chronology, Content, Context. University of Alabama Press. pp. 57–87. ISBN 978-0-8173-5409-1.
- Knight, Vernon James; Steponaitis, Vincas P. (January 15, 2011). "A Redefinition of the Hemphill Style in Mississippian Art". In Lankford, George E.; Reilly, F. Kent; Garber, James (eds.). Visualizing the Sacred: Cosmic Visions, Regionalism, and the Art of the Mississippian World (PDF). University of Texas Press. p. 227. ISBN 978-0292723085. Archived from the original (PDF) on February 23, 2013.
- Pauketat, Timothy R. (2009). Cahokia: Ancient America's Great City on the Mississippi. New York: Viking Adult. ISBN 978-0-670-02090-4.
- Pursell, Corin (2004). Geographic distribution and symbolism of colored mound architecture in the Mississippian Southeast (MA thesis). Southern Illinois University Carbondale. p. 205.
- Townsend, Richard F.; Sharp, Robert V.; Bailey, Garrick Alan (2000). Hero, Hawk, and Open Hand: American Indian Art of the Ancient Midwest and South. Yale University Press. ISBN 0-300-10601-7.
- Young, Biloine; Fowler, Melvin L. (2000). Cahokia: The Great Native American Metropolis. Urbana, Illinois: University of Illinois. ISBN 0-252-06821-1. Archived from the original on September 5, 2006. full text available at
