= Sugarloaf Mound =

- U.S. National Register of Historic Places
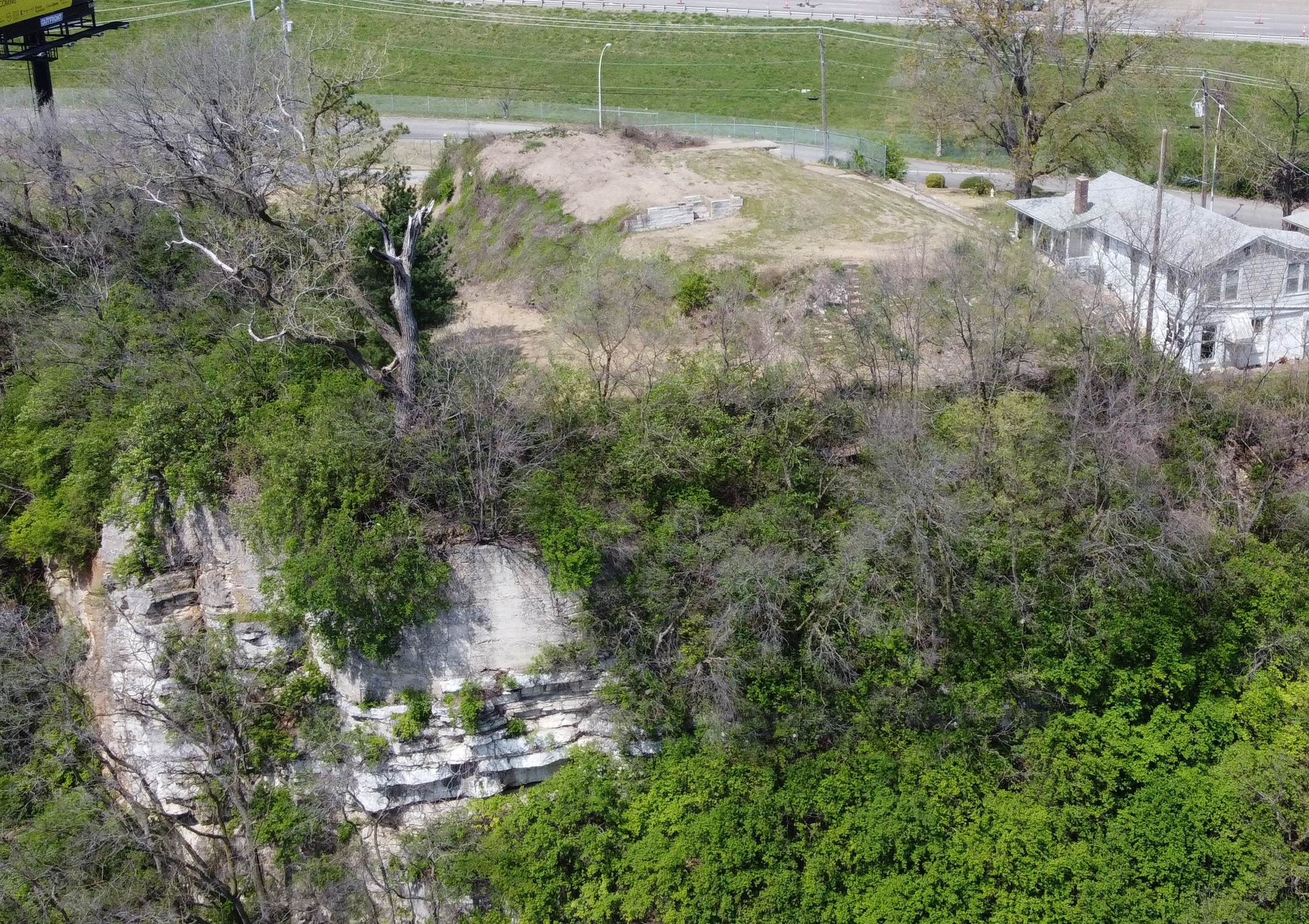
- View of Sugarloaf Mound and the cliffs on the bluff below it

- Location within St. Louis Location within Missouri Location within the United States
- Nearest city: St. Louis, Missouri
- Coordinates: 38°34′30″N 90°13′52″W
- Area: 1 acre (0.40 ha)
- NRHP reference No.: 84002689
- Added to NRHP: February 17, 1984

Sugarloaf Mound is the sole remaining Mississippian culture platform mound in St. Louis, Missouri, USA, a city commonly referred to in its earlier years as "Mound City" for its approximately 40 Native American earthen structures.

Sugarloaf Mound is the last remaining of the mounds built within present-day St. Louis by a Native American culture that thrived in the area from A.D. 600–1300. It is the oldest human-made structure in the city of St. Louis.

== Background ==
One of the city's best-known earthen structures, "Big Mound" was razed in the mid-1800s following a sale of the land to the North Missouri Railroad. In preparation for the 1904 World's Fair, an additional sixteen mounds were destroyed. The mounds in Forest Park were mapped and excavated and had human remains associated with them. A group of mounds was near the St. Louis Art Museum and some were near the golf course. Today, about 80 mounds are preserved in the nearby Cahokia Mounds State Historic Site directly across the Mississippi River. Sugarloaf Mound is the only one that remains of the original approximately 40 mounds in St. Louis. The mounds were constructed by Native Americans that lived in the St. Louis area from about 600 to 1300 AD, the same civilization that built the mounds at Cahokia. Sugarloaf Mound is on the National Register of Historic Places.

== Description ==
The mound got its name in the 18th century when St. Louisans noticed the shape resembled the loaves that sugar was transported in. Although the mound has not been excavated, it is assumed that the mound was used for burials, but it may also have been a ceremonial site or the location of a chief's home.

Flyaround of Sugarloaf Mound from a small drone

Sugarloaf Mound measures approximately 40 feet (12 m) in height, 100 feet (30 m) north/south and 75 feet (23 m) east/west. The mound overlooks the Mississippi River, where Interstate 55 meets South Broadway. It is now located entirely within the incorporated City of St. Louis, but used to be on the border between St. Louis and the formerly autonomous city of Carondelet. In 1809 the mound was used as a survey landmark when St. Louis was incorporated.

== Modern history ==
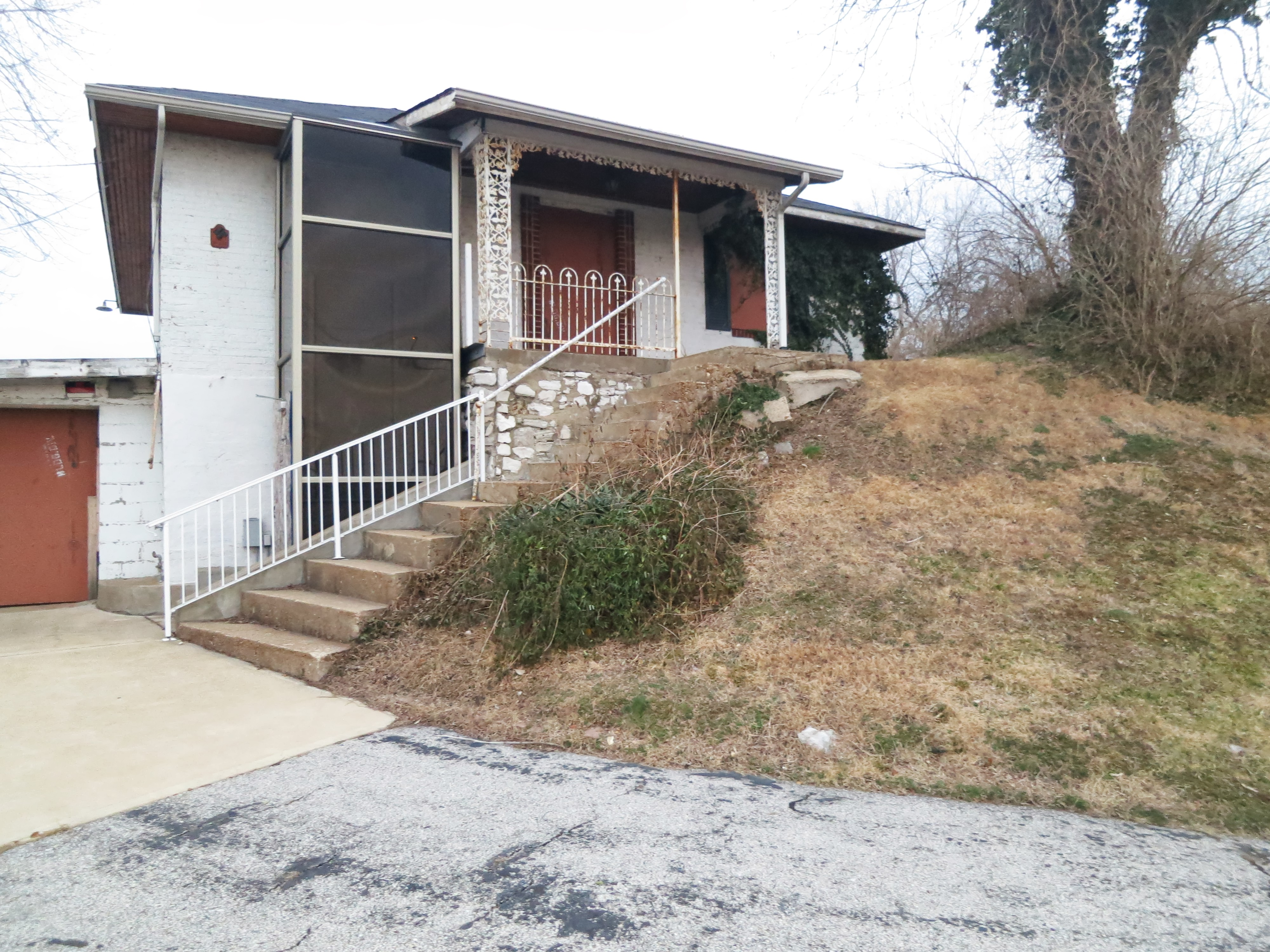
Sugarloaf Mound house (before removal).

A residence was constructed abutting the top level of Sugarloaf Mound in 1928 by Frederick and Nellie Adams, bearing the mailing address of 4420 Ohio Street. In the 1930s, the widow Nellie Adams, dressed in black, would still drive a horse and buggy around the area. Mrs. Adams died in 1948 in her nineties. The next owner of the house was Oliver Schauenberg with his wife Anna. He owned the house until 1962, when he sold it to Walter and Eileen Strosnider. The Strosniders owned it nearly half a century until they returned the mound to Native American ownership, selling it to the Osage Nation. Portions of the mound had been impacted by a quarry and the construction of Interstate 55, but due to the stewardship of the previous homeowners, major mound destruction was avoided. Vacant since 2009 and deteriorating, the house upon the mound has been dismantled and removed as of September 2017. As of November 2024, the second of three residences built on the three tiered Sugarloaf Mound has committed to return to the Osage. The owner of the home on the second tier, Joan Heckenberg, has agreed to return her property to the Osage. This leaves only one remaining residence on the lower level, owned by a pharmaceutical fraternity, Kappa Psi.

The home and land was purchased by the Osage Nation in 2009, with the stated intention of preservation of Sugarloaf Mound. The term "preservation" refers to the intention to restore Sugarloaf Mound to a condition similar to its configuration before the advent of non-Native American architectural embellishments and razings. The Osage Nation does not claim a direct link to the construction of the mound, but claims a kindred heritage of mound building in the American Midwest.

Ultimately, the Osage Nation wants to clear the structures from the mound and build an interpretive center to the north of the mound, on property now owned by the Missouri Department of Transportation.
