= Nauvoo Illinois Temple =

Temple of The Church of Jesus Christ of Latter-day Saints

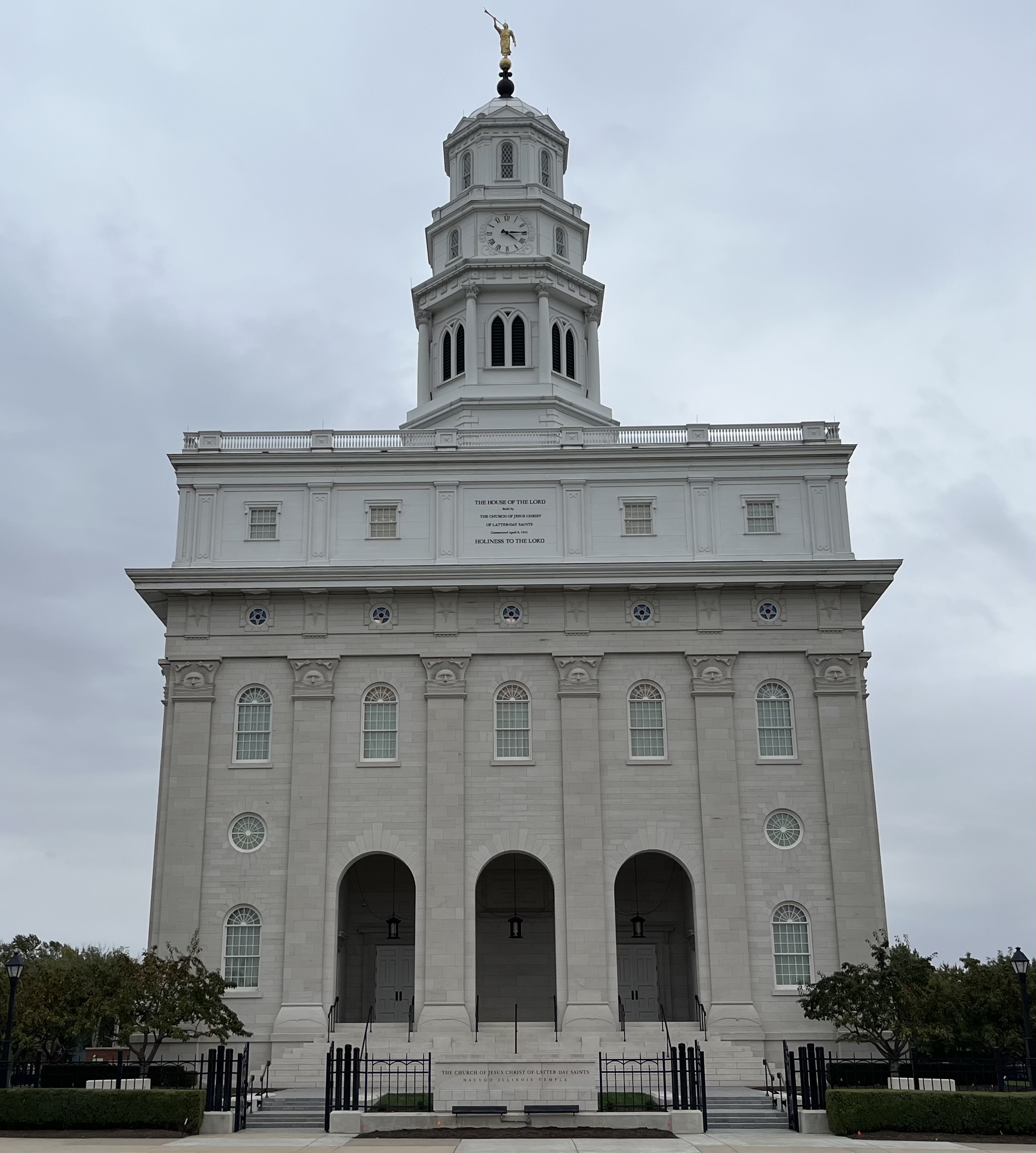
- Interactive map of Nauvoo Illinois Temple
- Number: 113
- Dedication: June 27, 2002, by Gordon B. Hinckley
- Site: 3.3 acres (1.3 ha)
- Floor area: 54,000 ft^{2} (5,000 m^{2})
- Height: 162 ft (49 m)
- Official website • News & images

Church chronology
← Asunción Paraguay Temple	Nauvoo Illinois Temple	→ The Hague Netherlands Temple

Additional information
- Announced: April 4, 1999, by Gordon B. Hinckley
- Groundbreaking: October 24, 1999, by Gordon B. Hinckley
- Open house: May 6 – June 22, 2002
- Current president: Richard Allen Thurman
- Designed by: FFKR Architecture based on design by William Weeks
- Location: Nauvoo, Illinois, U.S.
- Coordinates: 40°33′01.5″N 91°23′04.4″W
- Exterior finish: Limestone block quarried in Russellville, Alabama
- Design: Greek revival
- Baptistries: 1
- Ordinance rooms: 4 (four-stage progressive)
- Sealing rooms: 6
- Clothing rental: Yes
- Visitors' center: Yes
- Notes: Built on the site of the Nauvoo Temple and dedicated on the 158th anniversary of the death of Joseph Smith, the exterior is an almost exact reconstruction of the original temple. Primary difference is weather-vane has been replaced with a statue of the angel Moroni. However, the interior has 4 progressive ordinance rooms with murals like those in the early Utah temples leading to the celestial room and 6 sealing rooms.

The Nauvoo Illinois Temple is the 113th dedicated temple of the Church of Jesus Christ of Latter-day Saints (LDS Church). The intent to build the temple was announced on April 4, 1999, by church president Gordon B. Hinckley during general conference. It is the third temple built in Illinois (after the original Nauvoo Temple and the Chicago Illinois Temple).

The temple has an attached end tower with a statue of the angel Moroni. This temple’s architecture was designed to replicate the original Nauvoo Temple, which was designed by Joseph Smith. A groundbreaking ceremony, to signify the beginning of construction, was held on October 24, 1999, and was conducted by Hinckley.

== History ==
Located in the town of Nauvoo, the temple's construction was announced on April 4, 1999, by church president Gordon B. Hinckley. Groundbreaking was conducted on October 24, 1999 and the cornerstones were laid November 5, 2000, with Hinckley presiding over both ceremonies. The structure itself was built in the Greek Revival to replicate the architectural style of the original Nauvoo Temple, using limestone block quarried in Russellville, Alabama.

The origins of the new temple go back to 1937 when Wilford C. Wood purchased some of the land on behalf of the LDS Church and purchased another piece of land that he later sold to the church. He also organized a group of church members from the Chicago Illinois Stake, co-led by Ariel S. Williams, to clear and beautify the recently purchased land. At the time, the Chicago Stake was one of only two east of the Mississippi River.

Wood purchased land in 1951 that included a house which was made a visitors' center for the temple site. In the late-1950s, and then in 1962, agents for the LDS Church completed purchase of the temple lot.

Following construction, an open house was held from May 6-June 22, 2002. The temple was dedicated by Hinckley on June 27, 2002. The dedication was broadcast via satellite to “2,300 locations throughout 72 countries and in 38 languages,” making it the first temple dedication to be broadcast internationally.

== Design and architecture ==
The Nauvoo Illinois Temple was designed to replicate the original Nauvoo Temple, which utilized a mix of architectural styles, incorporating elements of Roman, Grecian, and Gothic architecture. Designed by FFKR Architects, the temple's architecture reflects both the cultural heritage of the Nauvoo region and its spiritual significance to the church.

The temple sits on a 3.3-acre plot, and the landscaping around the temple features a statue of Joseph and Hyrum Smith.

=== Exterior ===
The building is constructed with limestone similar to the stone used for the original Nauvoo Temple. The exterior has a single attached end tower with an angel Moroni statue, along with other elements chosen for their symbolic significance and alignment with temple traditions. The design uses elements which reflect both local culture and broader church symbolism.

The building measures approximately 130 feet (40 m) long, 90 feet (27 m) wide, and 162 feet (49 m) tall to the top of the statue of angel Moroni on top of the temple spire. It has an area of 54,000 square feet (5,000 m^{2}). It is the church's only operating temple that has a bell tower; the Kirtland Temple also has a bell tower, but it is not a functioning temple. The angel on the first Nauvoo temple was a weathervane, sculpted of metal. The figure was positioned horizontally as if it were flying, clothed in a robe and cap. The angel held a book in one hand and a trumpet in the other.

Church leaders and architects carefully worked to replicate the original exterior design of the 19th-century temple, which was damaged by an arson fire in 1848 and by a tornado on May 27, 1850. It was consequently condemned and demolished by the Nauvoo City Council. Construction materials and furniture were derived from the original design as well.

=== Interior ===
The interior is inspired by the time period of the original temple, including a spiral staircase. The temple includes five instruction rooms, a celestial room, six sealing rooms, an assembly room, a baptistry, and a chapel, each arranged for ceremonial use. Symbolic elements are integrated into the design, providing deeper meaning to the temple's function and aesthetics.

The interior floor plan of the temple is noticeably different from the original structure in which the endowment ceremony assumed its present format. At the direction of Joseph Smith, the west end of the attic story was divided by cloth partitions into four spaces used to administer the endowment. One of the canvas "rooms" was decorated with potted plants to suggest the Garden of Eden.

The Salt Lake City Endowment House and early Utah temples, each with a series of four ordinance rooms through which patrons moved during the presentation of the endowment, followed this layout. The first three rooms were decorated with murals representing, the creation of the world, the Garden of Eden, and the world after the fall of Adam and Eve. The fourth room, known as the Terrestrial Room, was ornately decorated but lacked murals. The Los Angeles California Temple, dedicated in 1956, was the last temple with this layout. Subsequent temples presented the endowment in one or two rooms without murals in the ordinance rooms. The use of murals resumed again in 2001 with the opening of the Columbia River Washington Temple. The Nauvoo Illinois Temple, using the four room layout, is the sole exception, as it has the four-room progressive format with murals decorating the first three rooms.

=== Symbols ===
The design includes elements representing Latter-day Saint and Biblical symbolism, representing spiritual meaning to the temple's appearance and function. Symbolism is important to church members. One example is the temple’s sunstones used to decorate the exterior, which are a recreation of the sunstones featured on the original Nauvoo Temple. Like the original, the temple features “30 pilasters, each with a moonstone at the base and a sunstone at the top,” with a star stone above each sunstone.

The sunstones were characterized by two hands holding trumpets above an image of the sun rising above clouds, while the moonstones featured relief carvings of downward-facing crescent moons. The star stones consisted of large five-pointed stars, each with an elongated bottom ray Together, these elements represent “the glory of the latter-day church or kingdom, further symbolized by the sun rising through the clouds, with the trumpets heralding the restoration of the gospel and the glory of the latter-day Church of Jesus Christ.”

== Cultural and community impact ==
The temple and its surrounding grounds have been a gathering place for community events, including the Nauvoo Pageant and the British Pageant, which are both held every summer in Nauvoo. The Nauvoo Pageant is narrated by Parley P. Pratt, and tells the story of Joseph Smith, the early LDS Church, and the Nauvoo Temple. The British Pageant portrays the English Reformation and the church's first missions to Britain.

The temple and the historic Nauvoo sites are managed by the church and provide educating and spiritually uplifting elements and insights into church history in Nauvoo. The Historic Nauvoo Visitors' Center, equipped with historic exhibits including a diorama of Nauvoo, provides all visitors with an understanding of the faith of early church members and the temple's unique place in church history.

=== Temple presidents ===
The church's temples are directed by a temple president and matron, each typically serving a term of three years. The president and matron oversee the administration of temple operations and provide guidance and training for both temple patrons and staff. Notable presidents include Richard W. Winder (2002–04), who was the first after its dedication, and Spencer J. Condie (2010–13).

As of 2024, Chris V. Church is the president, with Jane H. Church as matron.

== Admittance ==
After the temple was completed, a public open house from 6 May to 22 June 2002 attracted over 250,000 visitors. The dedication on June 27, 2002, was the anniversary of the death of Joseph Smith, the church's founder.

Up to 1.5 million visitors a year have visited Nauvoo since the temple opened in 2002.

In 2020, like all the church's other temples, the Nauvoo Illinois Temple was closed for a time in response to the coronavirus pandemic.

Like all the church's temples, it is not used for Sunday worship services. To members of the church, temples are regarded as sacred houses of the Lord. Once dedicated, only church members with a current temple recommend can enter for worship.

== Gallery ==
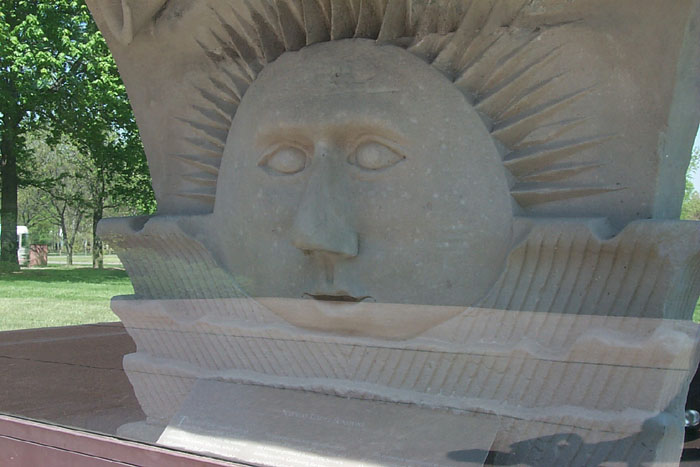
A Sunstone from the original Nauvoo Temple

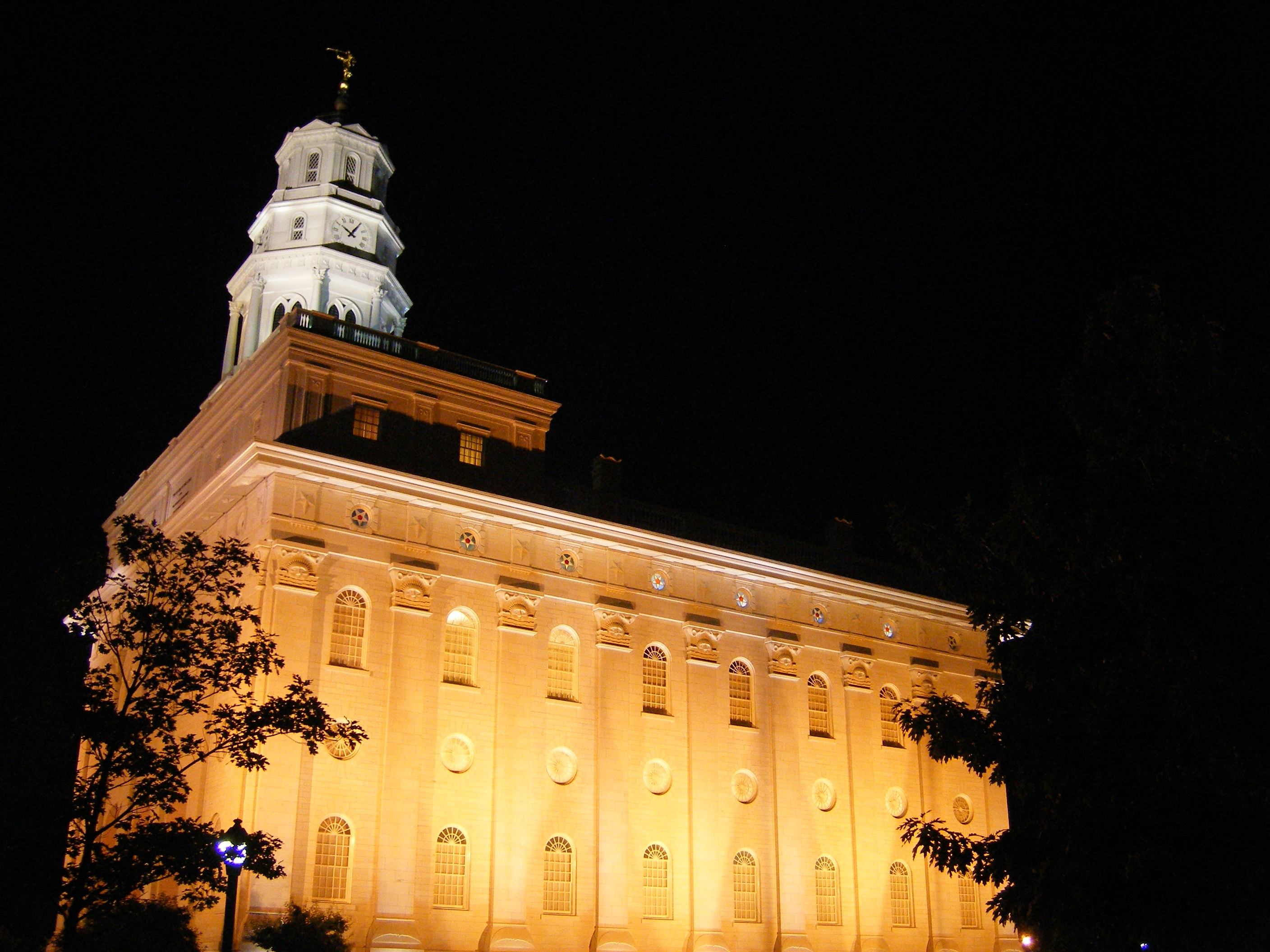
The Nauvoo Illinois Temple at night

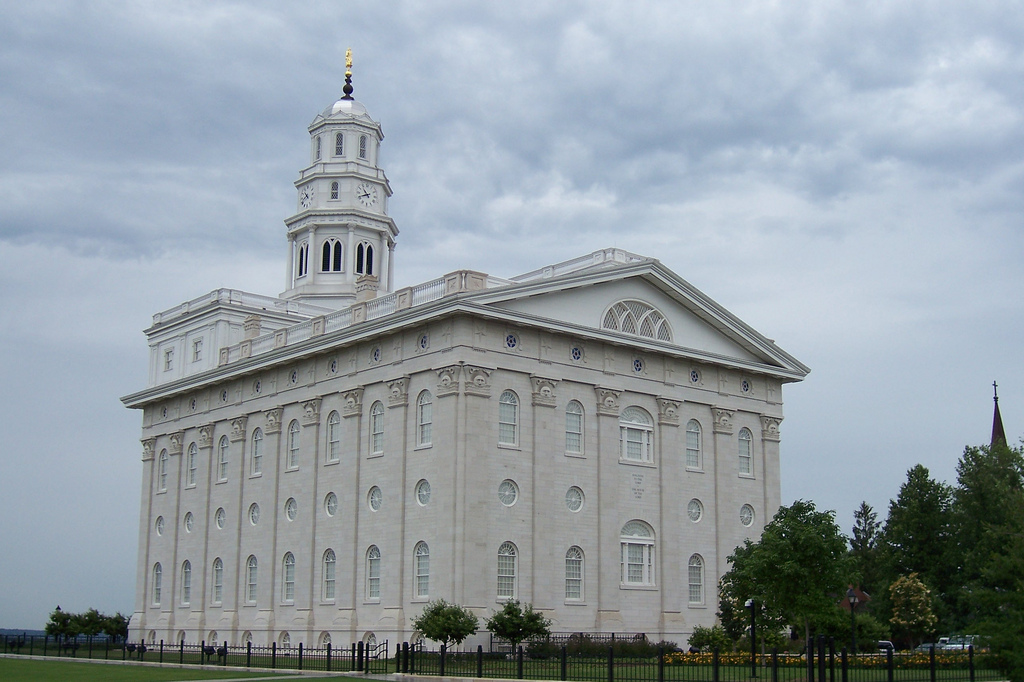
The back of the temple.

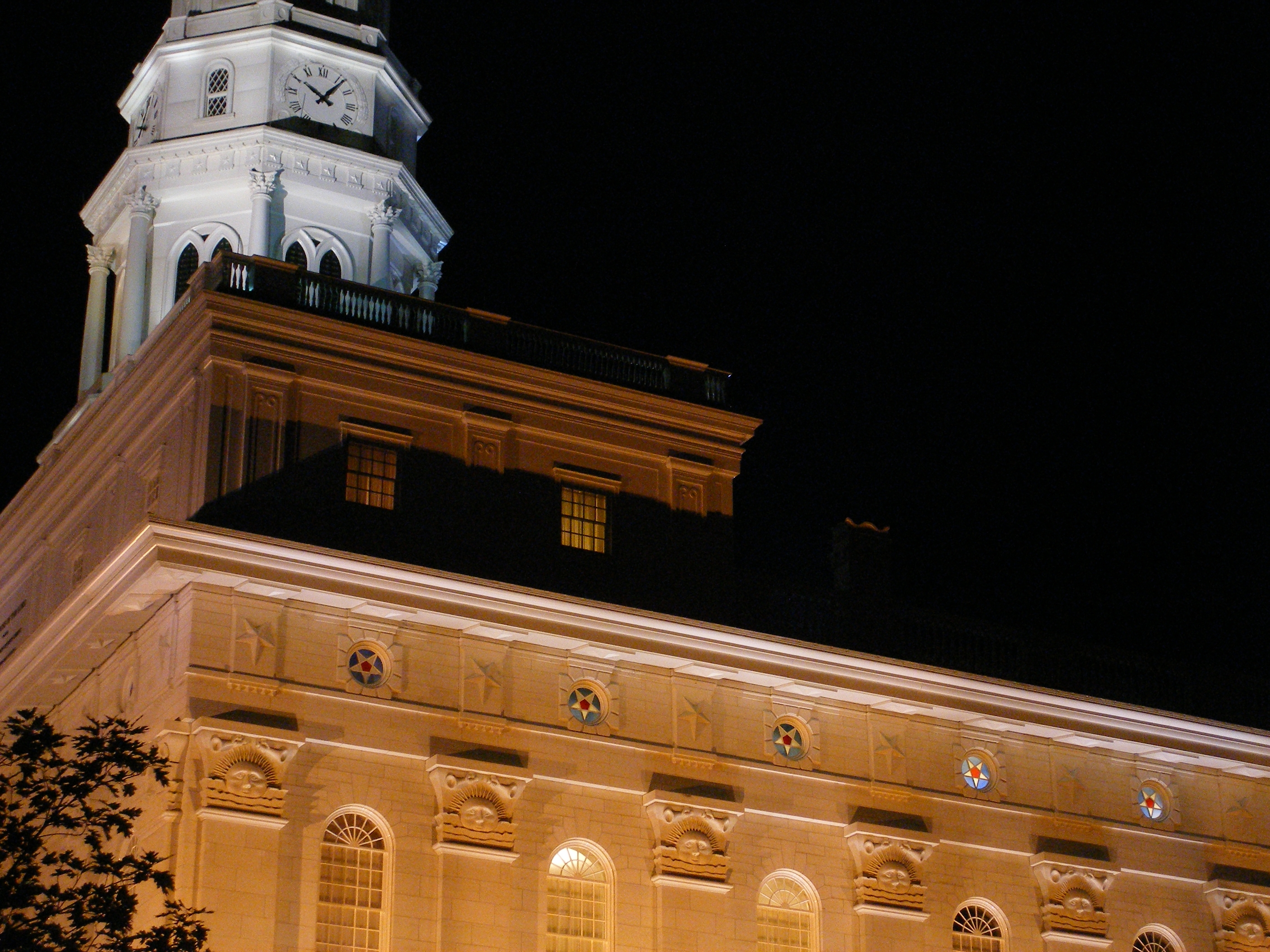
Close up of the details of the temple.

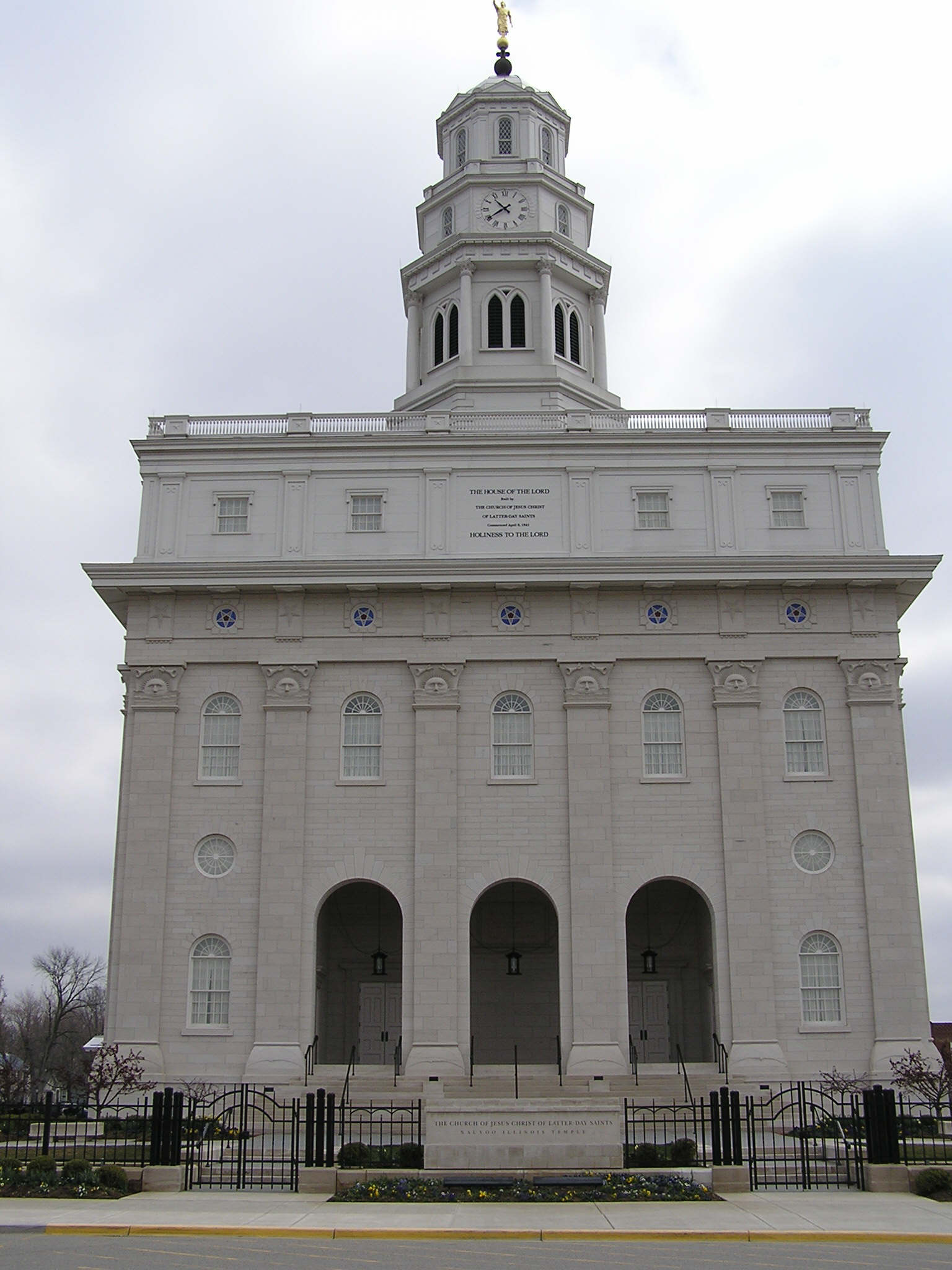
Close up at the front entrance.

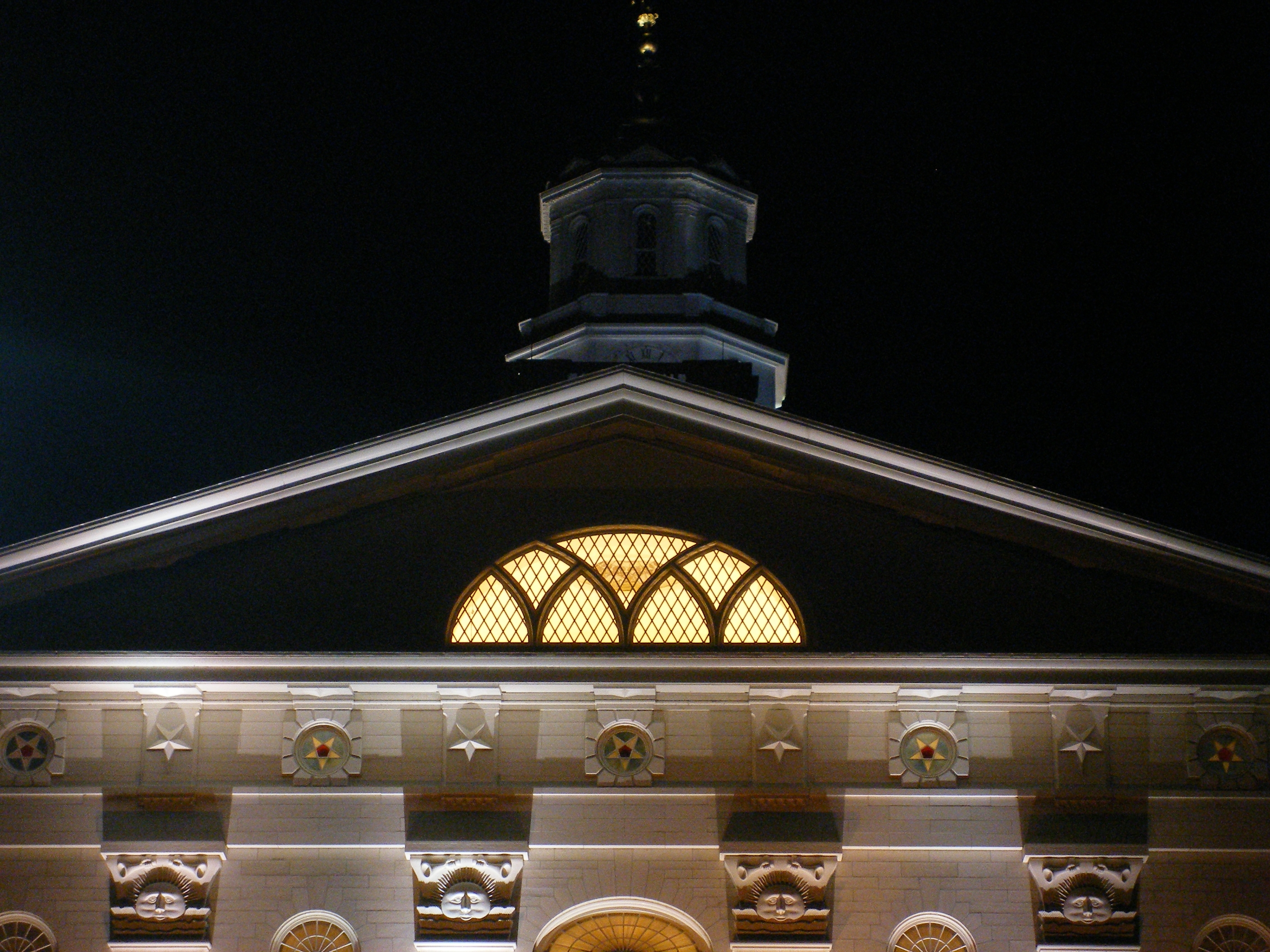
Close up of the east side of the temple.

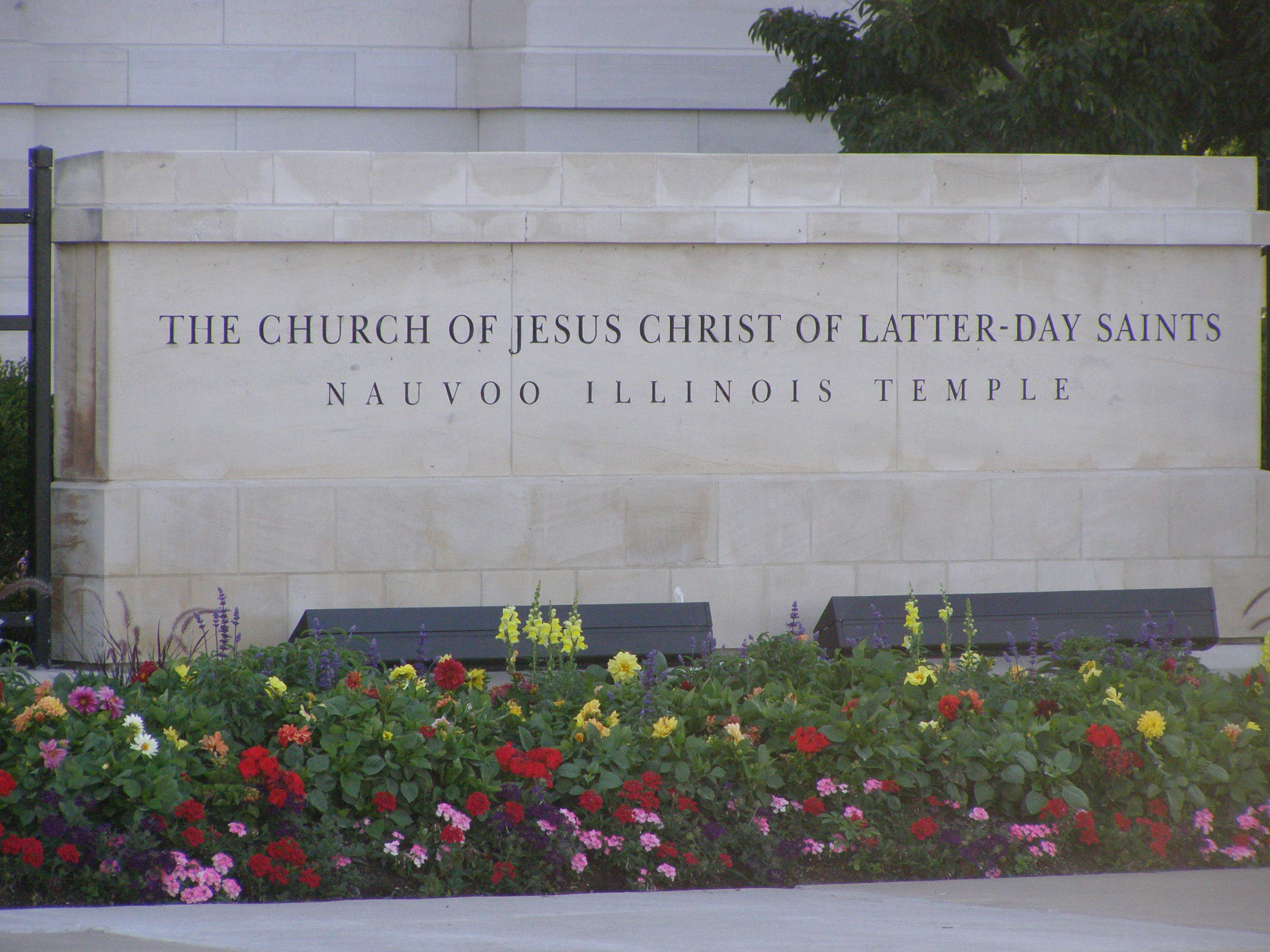
Sign in front of the temple
