= Mound 72 =

Ridgetop Mississippian mound in Madison County, Illinois

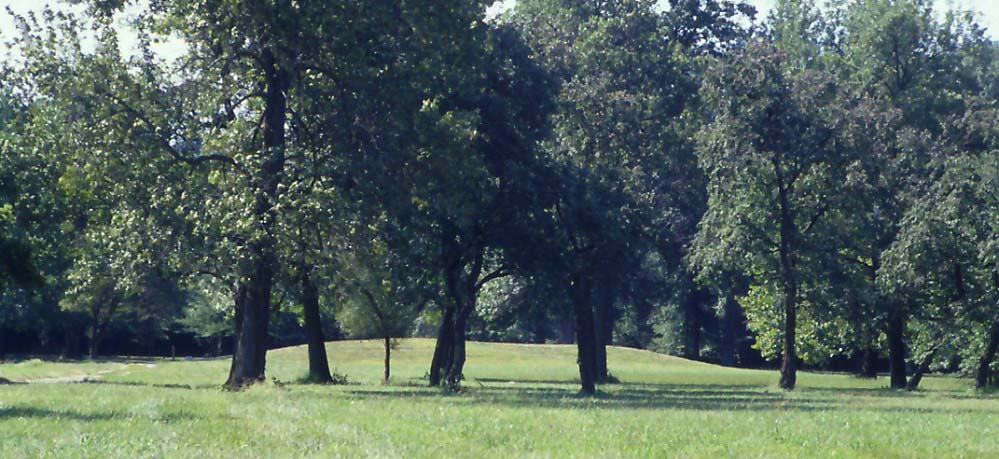
- Mound 72, reconstructed after major excavations

- Location within Illinois today
- 38°39′2.02″N 90°3′48.24″W
- Cultures: Middle Mississippian culture
- Location: Collinsville, Illinois, Madison County, Illinois, United States
- Region: Madison County, Illinois

Site notes
- Architectural styles: timber circle, platform mound, ridgetop mound, mass burial Number of temples: 2
- Excavation dates: 1967–1972, 1992–1997,
- Archaeologists: Melvin L. Fowler

Mound 72 is a small ridgetop mound located roughly 850 meters (2,790 ft) to the south of Monks Mound at Cahokia Mounds near Collinsville, Illinois. Early in the site's history, the location began as a circle of 48 large wooden posts known as a "woodhenge". The woodhenge was later dismantled and a series of mortuary houses, platform mounds, mass burials and eventually the ridgetop mound erected in its place. The mound was the location of the "beaded burial", an elaborate burial of an elite personage thought to have been one of the rulers of Cahokia, accompanied by the graves of several hundred retainers and sacrificial victims.

== Mound 72 Woodhenge ==
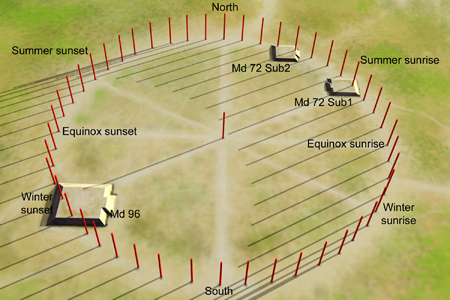
Solstice and equinox sunrise and sunset markers at the Md 72 Woodhenge

Early in the history of Cahokia the portion of the site containing Mounds 72 and 96 was the location of a "woodhenge", a ceremonial area with a 412 feet (126 m) in diameter circle of 48 upright wooden posts. Archaeologists date the placement of at least one of the posts to approximately 950 CE. Archaeological research has shown that four of the posts were at the cardinal locations of north, south, east and west, the eastern and western posts marking the position of the equinox sunrise and sunsets. Four other posts in the circle were shown to be at the summer solstice sunrise and sunset and the winter solstice sunrise and sunset positions. This setup is nearly identical to the diameter and post positions of Woodhenge III, one of five successive woodhenges built in another location at Cahokia, differing only in that Woodhenge III was 2 feet (0.61 m) smaller in diameter. Considering the size of the circle and the fact that the post holes themselves could be as much as 1 metre (3.3 ft) in diameter, this discrepancy is almost negligible. The placement of the two mounds at the location and the directions in which they are oriented correspond to several of the solstice marking posts. The post nearest the later elite burial of the "Birdman" is the location that marked the summer solstice sunrise at the times of the site's use. The early stages of the mounds were actually constructed around the posts, although at a later point the posts were removed. Besides their celestial marking functions, the woodhenges also carried religious and ritual meaning that is reflected in their stylized depiction as a Cross in Circle Motif on ceremonial beakers connected with black drink ceremonialism. One prominent example has markers added to the winter sunrise and sunset positions.

Mound 72 is a ridgetop mound, one of only six recorded at the Cahokia site. Unlike the other ridgetop mounds which are aligned east/west and north/south (as are most other features at the large site), Mound 72 is aligned 30 degrees off the east/west line. This alignment is the same as the summer solstice sunrise/winter solstice sunset line for this latitude. Near the end of the late Emergent Mississippian Edelhardt Phase or the beginning of the early Mississippian Lohmann Phase (1000-1050 CE) two small platform mounds were constructed around several of the woodhenge posts, one of them the position marking the summer solstice sunrise position. These mounds were expanded and eventually merged and covered over, being reshaped in the process into the final Mound 72 ridge-top mound.

=== Mound 72sub1 ===
The beginnings of the mounds were the interment of several elite personages oriented to the summer solstice sunrise post. This post is aligned with the north/south axis with a point on the southwest corner of Monks Mound. The post had been replaced several times, including at least one episode after the beginning of mound construction. After the burial the location was covered over with Mound 72sub1, a small platform mound oriented in an east/west axis with a ramp projecting to the east and another projecting west toward the summer solstice sunset post. The summer sunrise post was located in the center of the eastern side of the mound.

==== Beaded or Birdman burial ====
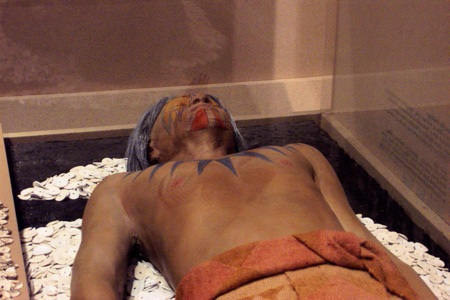
Reconstruction of the Birdman burial in the site's interpretative center

Five metres (16 ft) west of the post was the burial of paired male/female elite pairs. The bodies were placed with their feet to the northwest on an elevated platform between a bed of 10,000 marine-shell disc beads arranged in the shape of a bird, with the bird's head beneath and beside the heads, and its wings and tail beneath the arms and legs. This burial is now known as the "Beaded burial" or the "Birdman burial." The falcon warrior or "birdman" is a common motif in Mississippian culture, and is even represented by other finds at Cahokia in the form of two small stone tablets with avian-human imagery. Below the birdman was a woman, buried facing downward. This burial clearly had powerful iconographic significance to the peoples of Cahokia.

==== Exotic Cache Burial ====
The Beaded Burial was accompanied by other high status burials. A group of seven women nicknamed the "Exotic Cache burial" had grave goods, including 1,674 marine shell beads, a large amount of mica, copper-covered wooden scepters, 15 chunkey stones and 709 finely made arrowheads collected from throughout the Mississippian world, specifically caches from Tennessee, southern Illinois, Wisconsin and a batch from the Caddoan Mississippian peoples in Oklahoma. These women may have been the preeminent people buried in Mound 72. The arrowheads strongly indicated that Cahokia had extensive trade links in North America.

=== Mound 72sub2 and 72sub3 ===
This mound was constructed precisely over the remains of a dismantled charnel house that was thought to have been erected at roughly the same time as the woodhenge post which it is next to. Interred in the mound were two recently deceased men and several bundled burials, probably the previous residents of the charnel house who had waited for the elite personages to die in order to be interred with them. Over this first phase a 46-foot (14 m) square platform with two levels and ramp on its eastern side was constructed. The next episode of construction at this location involved a pit being dug into the mound and a cache of various grave goods being deposited in it. A large rectangular pit was dug into the southeast corner of the mound and a mass burial of 24 women was made in it. A new layer of fill was added to the mound and it was extended to the southeast toward Mound 72sub1, for a ramp or extension over the mass burial.

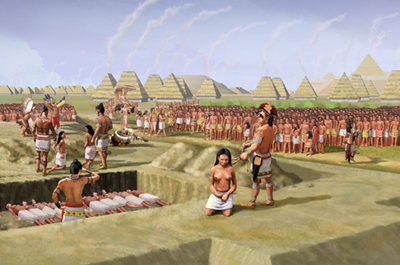
Mound 72 mass sacrifice of 53 young women

==== Mound 72Sub2 ====
===== Shell Bead Cache Burials =====
In the western part of the mound, a pit of 35,361 shell beads was placed on top of a group of 19 probable women (Features 236 and 237), thus nicknamed the Shell Bead Cache. Along with the 32,789 lightning whelk columella beads, 2,327 seed beads, and 245 whole shell beads, was the largest lightning whelk cup ever found, about 39 cm long. This, including the stone effigy of a woman holding a lightning whelk cup, indicates the importance of lightning whelk cups, and the women that probably crafted them. These elite crafters may have been retainers for the seven women in the Exotic Cache Burial (see above). These marine shell artifacts are the most numerous from Mississippian sites except for the Spiro site.

==== Mound 72Sub3 ====
The next episode of construction involved three stages. A small platform was constructed near the southeastern ramp and four young males with their arms interlocked and missing their hands and skulls were laid out on the platform. Some researchers have concluded that the four men may represent the four cardinal directions.

In a pit excavated next to these four men were placed the bodies of a large group of young women. This mass grave contained the remains of 53 females ranging between 15 and 30 years of age, arranged in two layers separated by matting. The young women show evidence of having been strangled before being arranged in neat rows in the pit. Analysis of bones and dental traits of these women have led archaeologists to believe these individuals were not from the same social class and ethnic group as other individuals interred in the mound. Non-metric dental traits have suggested that these individuals were not from the Cahokia area and were possibly immigrants new to the area. Analysis of specific carbon isotope and nitrogen isotope ratios left by maize consumption in the bones and cartilage of the women, as well as pathologies indicative of poor health and nutritional stress, have led researchers to also conclude they were of a lower social status than elite burials in the mound, consuming more maize and less animal protein than elite individuals.

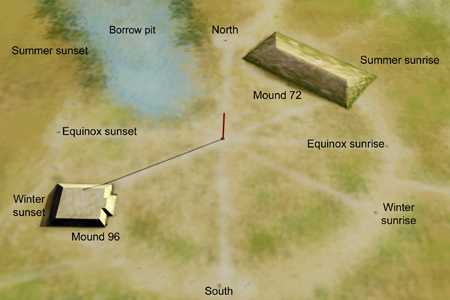
The location after the removal of the timber circle and the final cap of Mound 72

This entire construction was then covered and extended even further toward Mound 72sub1 and now dubbed by archaeologists as Mound 72sub3. Next to this mound to the southwest another mass burial was made. This burial is the most grisly found at the site, containing 39 men and women who appear to have been violently killed. Before the mass interment a pit was dug and lined with white sand. The victims were then killed and thrown over the edge of the pit. These people showed signs of meeting a violent end, including several being incompletely decapitated, some with fractured skulls and others with fractured jawbones. The evidence shows that some of these individuals were buried alive: "From the vertical position of some of the fingers, which appear to have been digging in the sand, it is apparent that not all of the victims were dead when they were interred – that some had been trying to pull themselves out of the mass of bodies." The presence of arrowheads in the back of some of these victims, coupled with the beheadings and other evidence of violent death, has led some researchers to conclude that these victims show evidence of warfare or were even the losers of a rebellion against the rulers of Cahokia, possibly even objectors to the earlier sacrifices of the young women. On top of them were the remains of 15 elite individuals laid out upon litters made from cedar poles and cane matting. Radiocarbon dating of the cedar poles used for the litters in the top layer burials in this pit determined that this burial was made approximately 100 years after the woodhenge circle had been constructed, or in approximately 1030 CE.

Numerous secondary bundle burials of the bones of individuals previously stored in a charnel house were also made into the mound. After a few final intrusive burials into the southwestern edge, Sub3 and Sub1 were covered over in a blanket of earth and given its distinctive ridgetop shape. All of the burials in the mound are located within an area circumscribed by the arc of the woodhenge circle. In total some 272 individuals had been interred in Mound 72 in six separate episodes of burial, taking place over a roughly one hundred-year period. Researchers theorize that this could represent the lineage of a prominent family along with many retainers and sacrifices. Scholars believe almost 62 percent of the over 270 people interred in the mound were sacrificial victims, based on signs of ritual execution, method of burial, and other factors.

=== Similarities to historical events ===
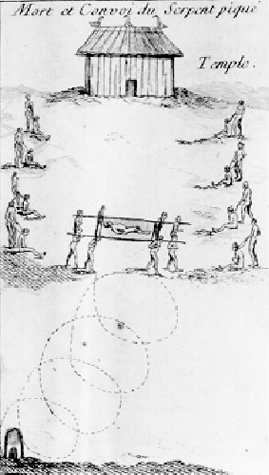
The funeral procession of Tattooed Serpent in 1725, with retainers waiting to be sacrificed

A similar ritual human sacrifice of retainers and commoners upon the death of an elite personage is attested in the historical record among the Natchez, the last remaining fully Mississippian culture in the southeastern United States. Upon the death of "Tattooed Serpent" in 1725, the war chief and younger brother of the "Great Sun" or Chief of the Natchez, two of his wives, one of his sisters (nicknamed La Glorieuse by the French), his first warrior, his doctor, his head servant and the servant's wife, his nurse, and a craftsman of war clubs all chose to die and be interred with him, as well as several old women and an infant who was strangled by his parents. Great honor was associated with such a sacrifice, and their kin was held in high esteem. After a funeral procession with the chief's body carried on a litter made of cane matting and cedar poles ended at the temple (which was located on top of a low platform mound), the retainers, with their faces painted red and accompanied by their relatives, dressed up in their finest garments, were drugged with large doses of nicotine, and ritually strangled. Tattooed Serpent was then buried in a trench inside the temple floor and the retainers were buried in other locations atop the mound surrounding the temple. After a few months time the bodies were dis-interred and their defleshed bones were stored as bundle burials in the temple.

== Mound 96 ==
Mound 96 is a virtual mirror image of Mound 72 sub 1. It was another small nearly square platform mound measuring approximately 15 metres (49 ft) wide at its base and a projecting ramp on its eastern side giving it a T-shape. It was built around the location of the winter sunset pole of the woodhenge and oriented along the north/south and east/west alignment common at Cahokia, with the ramp facing the winter solstice sunrise pole. The ramp starts at 5 metres (16 ft) wide at its base, but narrows to 50 centimetres (1.6 ft) in width at its top. Radiocarbon dating and ceramic analysis of sherds found in the mound place its beginning construction date to the Lohmann Phase (1000-1050 CE), at roughly the same time as Mound 72. The mound, also like Mound 72, was finished with a hard cap of black clay, thought by archaeologists to have been engineered by its builders as a protective layer to protect the mound from erosion. The mound is thought to contain burials as well, but due to new federal laws concerning the excavation of Native American remains the portions of the mound suspected to have burials have not been excavated.

== Excavations ==
In the 1960s archaeologist Melvin L. Fowler noticed that the northeastern corner of the unusually aligned Mound 72 was located on a north/south axis aligned with the southwestern corner of Monks Mound and the western edge of Mound 49, an east/west oriented ridgetop mound located within the Grand Plaza area of downtown Cahokia. After discussions with Warren Wittry (the discoverer of the Cahokia Woodhenge) about the north/south axis alignment and the mounds longitudinal alignment along the axis of the solstices, he hypothesized that a large post may have marked the location. After getting funding he began a series of excavations at the mound in 1967 that lasted into the early 1970s. The post pit hole was found where he had predicted it would be, as were several others in an arc to the northwest, along with the spectacular series of burials located within and under the mound. Mound 96, a previously unnoticed small mound to the southwest, was discovered and numbered at this time. By 1977 Fowler was again studying aerial photos and maps of the location when he noticed that measurements concerning the two mounds and associated postholes corresponded nearly exactly with circumference and diameter measurements from Woodhenge III. He plotted a set of postholes predictions and eventually received funding to excavate in the early 1990s. In excavations lasting throughout the 1990s he excavated parts of Mound 96 and several projected posthole locations looking for proof of a hypothesized southern woodhenge at Cahokia. Not all archaeologists associated with Cahokia agreed with his conclusions and predictions at the time. Although weather-related problems, low-lying terrain with flooding issues and other factors made the endeavor difficult, Fowler eventually located several other post pits at or near their predicted locations, including the winter solstice sunset position under Mound 96.

== Gallery of related images ==
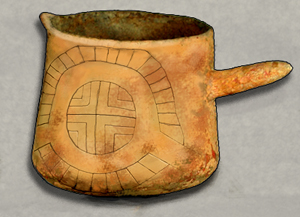
Ceramic beaker with woodhenge motif

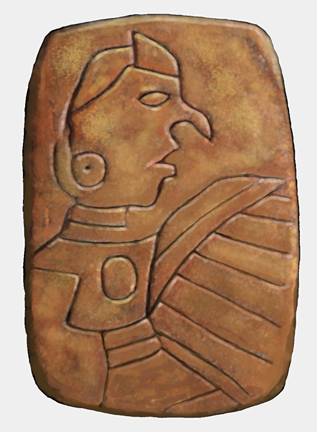
Birdman sandstone tablet excavated from Monks Mound in 1971

== See also ==
- List of Mississippian sites
- Moorehead Circle
- Morning Star ceremony
- Mound 34
