= William Weeks =

American architect (1813–1900)

William Weeks (March 11, 1813 – March 8, 1900), was the first church architect of the Church of Jesus Christ of Latter Day Saints, and is best known as the architect of the Nauvoo Temple.

Weeks was the son of James Weeks, Jr., and Sophronia Fisher and was born on March 11, 1813, on Martha's Vineyard, Massachusetts. He came from a family of builders; his father taught architectural and building skills to his two sons, William and Arwin. Raised as a Quaker, Weeks converted to the Latter Day Saint church in the southeastern states. Apparently, he was in Missouri when the members of the church were driven from that state during the winter of 1838–1839, and he settled in Quincy, Illinois. There on June 11, 1839, he married Caroline Matilda Allen, youngest child of Elihu Marcellus Allen and his first wife Laura Foote. Caroline was ten years his junior. Their marriage lasted sixty-one years and produced ten children, seven of whom died in early infancy.

== Nauvoo Temple ==
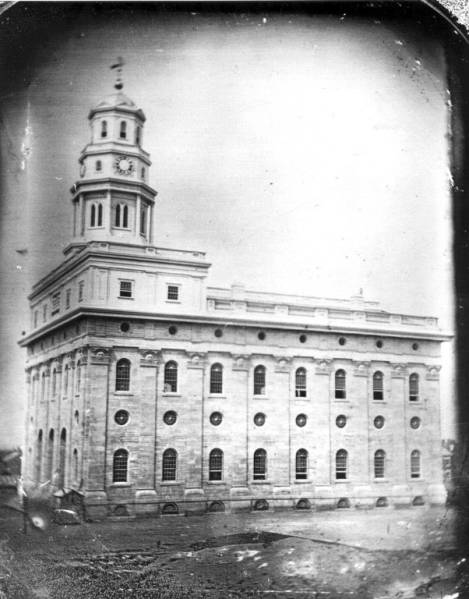
Undated photograph of the Nauvoo Temple.

In 1840 Weeks relocated to Nauvoo, where he built a new brick home, which still stands. When Joseph Smith, called for architects to submit designs for the Nauvoo Temple, he was so impressed with Weeks' drawings that he hugged him, exclaiming, "You are the man I want!" While Weeks was the temple's architect, final decisions about the building design were made by Smith, who overruled Weeks on occasions. Most famous is Smith's insistence that circular windows, instead of oval, be used in the temple, although Weeks insisted that such windows were a violation of all known rules of architecture. Smith did not extend such latitude over Weeks to others. When the Temple Building Committee got into an argument with Weeks, Smith prepared a certificate for Weeks that stated that "no person or persons shall interfere with him or his plans in building the temple." When Smith was killed in June 1844, Brigham Young assumed Smith's role as the church's leader, which included oversight of the temple's construction; Young even made his own changes to Smith's design. Weeks did not see the temple completed, because Young insisted that he accompany the Mormon migration west so that he could design a new temple when the Mormons found a place to settle. On February 13, 1846, Brigham Young turned the final completion of the Nauvoo Temple over to Truman O. Angell.

== Architect ==
Weeks can be grouped into the larger general category of vernacular designers or bricoleurs, a term defined by Thomas Hubka:

Folk builders are not often given the status of architectural designers. This is unfortunate because folk builders have rigorous, highly structured design methods for generating and refining spatial form. Although folk design methods differ from those employed by modern architectural designers, their object is the same – the conversion of ideas into spatial form.

Hubka argued that a bricoleur's design strategy involves the unremitting practice of "composition and decomposition within a vocabulary of existing building forms." The resulting architecture constitutes a reorganization of the "hierarchy of ideas (schemata)" included within the stylistic customs and techniques of existing buildings. The Nauvoo temple is a classic experiment in bricolage and by decomposing traditional architectural language with which he was familiar, Weeks created a novel material response to shifting theological and ritual practices.

== Disaffection with Mormonism ==
Weeks arrived in Salt Lake City in September 1847. He soon became disaffected with the Church of Jesus Christ of Latter-day Saints (LDS Church), and took his family east the next summer, taking all of the Nauvoo Temple plans with him. For a time Weeks settled in Wisconsin and Iowa. While in Iowa, he learned of Nauvoo Temple's arson. He returned to Utah in 1852, apparently seeking reconciliation and reinstallation as the architect for the Salt Lake Temple. However, Young used Angell as the architect of the building. After his work as architect on the Nauvoo Temple, Weeks never worked as an architect again. By 1857 he had settled in San Bernardino, California, where he severed all contact with the LDS Church, although he remained an admirer of Joseph Smith all his life. He stayed in California the rest of his life.

== Later life ==
Weeks did not pursue work as an architect in California, but moved to El Monte, where he worked as a carpenter and later ran a gristmill for a Mr. Temple. He purchased a herd of cows and opened a 160-acre (0.65 km^{2}) dairy in Hollywood, providing milk to Los Angeles groceries. He later moved the dairy to Green Meadow, six miles north of Los Angeles. When he became too old to run the dairy, he purchased a small ranch and built a house in Palms, where he and Caroline lived the rest their lives. Weeks died on March 8, 1900.

== Nauvoo Temple drawings ==
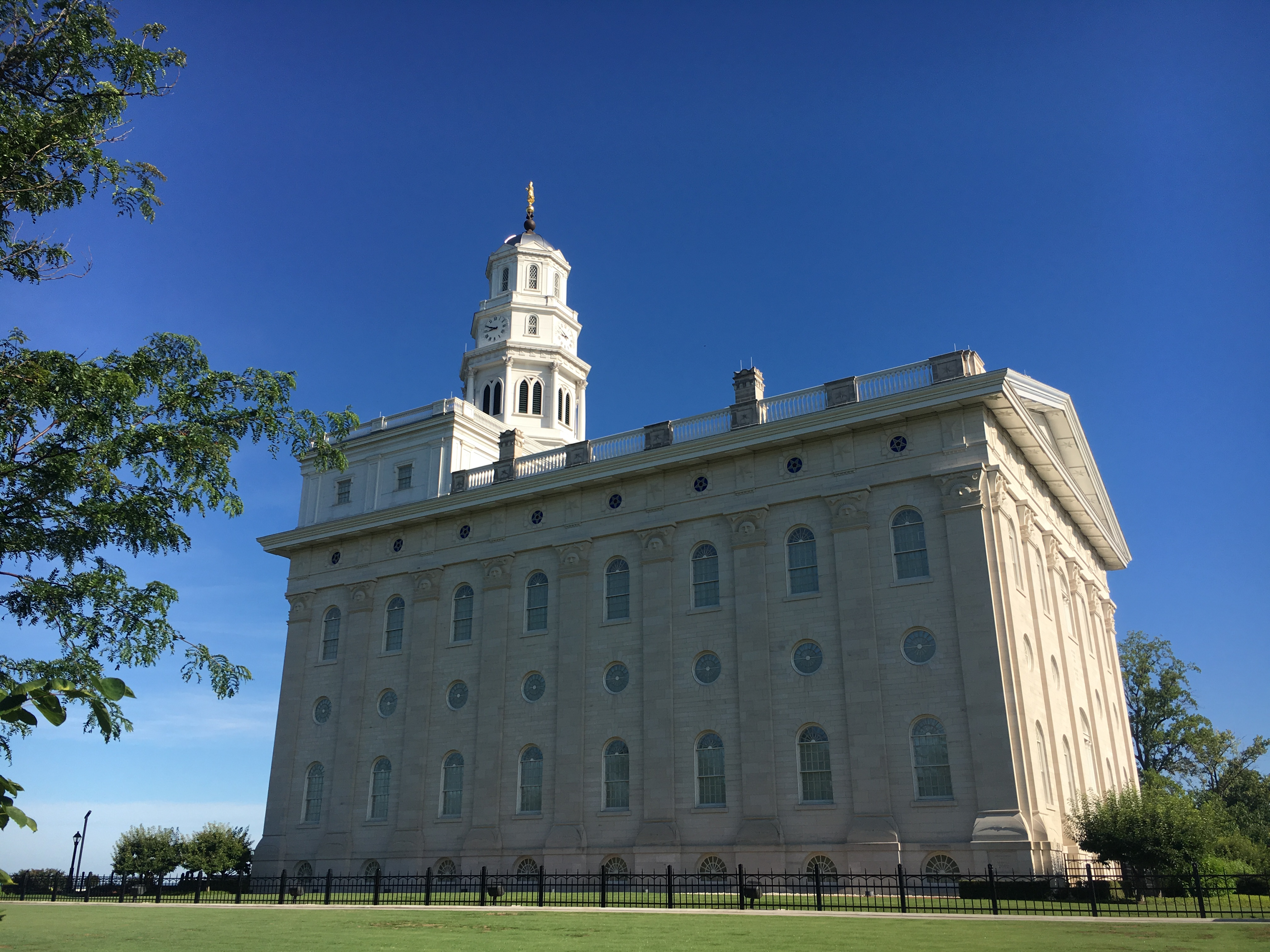
The rebuilt Nauvoo Illinois Temple, completed in 1999

Weeks' drawings of the Nauvoo Temple remained with his descendants, passing from Weeks to his daughter Caroline F. Weeks Griffin, who passed them to her son, Leslie Griffin. In 1948 two Mormon missionaries, Frank Gifford and Vern Thacker, contacted Griffin while tracting door to door in Boron, California. Griffin and the two missionaries became friends, and, when Griffin learned that Thacker was returning to Salt Lake City, he gave him Weeks' drawings to donate to the LDS Church. Thacker did as Griffin requested, and Weeks' original drawings proved invaluable in the later reconstruction of the Nauvoo Illinois Temple.

== Other works ==
The Isaac Chase Mill, designed by Weeks and built in 1852, now part of Liberty Park, 6th East Salt Lake City, UT, is listed on the U.S. National Register of Historic Places.

He also made the design for the Nauvoo Arsenal.

== See also ==
- Temple architecture (Latter-day Saints)

== Sources ==
- Arrington, Earl J. (1979). "William Weeks: Architect of the Nauvoo Temple". Brigham Young University Studies. 19 (3): 337–360. JSTOR 43044947 – via JSTOR.
- Bennion, Marjorie Hopkins (2002). "The Rediscovery of Williams Weeks' Nauvoo Temple Drawings" (PDF). Mormon Historical Studies. 3 (1): 73–90.
- Cornell, Steven (2009). William Weeks and the Ephemeral Temple at Nauvoo (MArH thesis). University of Virginia. pp. 48–49. doi:10.18130/V3028PC64.
