= Wilford C. Wood =

Personal details
- Born: Wilford Cotton Wood; May 22, 1893; Woods Cross, Utah, United States
- Died: January 17, 1968 (aged 74); Salt Lake City, Utah, United States
- Spouse(s): Lillian Lambert Woodbury

Wilford C. Wood (May 22, 1893 – January 17, 1968), was an American businessman and prominent member of the Latter Day Saint movement who was responsible for acquiring many of the historic sites of the Church of Jesus Christ of Latter-day Saints (LDS Church), including the Nauvoo Temple, Liberty Jail, and Adam-ondi-Ahman.

After serving an LDS Church mission in the Northern States Mission for almost four years, Wood gained success in the fur business and frequently visited New York City. During those trips, he would visit historic sites, including locations in New York State, Ohio, and Missouri.

== LDS Church historic sites ==
At the start of the twentieth century, the LDS Church held title to few of the significant sites associated with its early history. Wood's efforts led to the acquisition of the Nauvoo Temple site; Liberty Jail, Adam-ondi-Ahman; the Newel K. Whitney Store; John Johnson Farm; and the Hale property in Harmony, Pennsylvania, on which the Aaronic priesthood was restored. In February 1937, the Bank of Nauvoo planned to auction off a portion of the city lot where the Nauvoo Temple once stood and Wood alerted the LDS Church's First Presidency. Wood, acting as the LDS Church's agent, asked the bank, "Are you going to try to make us pay an exorbitant price for the blood of the martyred Prophet when you know this property rightfully belongs to the Mormon people?" The bank officials agreed and negotiated a sale to Wood for $900. In 1944, Wood purchased 38 acres at Adam-ondi-Ahman (an additional 3,000 acres have since been purchased).

Wood also acquired many historical artifacts, including an original uncut 1830 edition of the Book of Mormon and the Smith brothers' genuine death masks. The uncut 1830 edition of the Book of Mormon was acquired by trading one of Wood's fur coats, which was worth less than $1,000. His personal stationery carried the phrase "Lest we forget."

== Personal life ==
Wilford married Lillian Lambert Woodbury and had two daughters.
