= Melvin L. Fowler =

American archaeologist and author

Melvin L. Fowler (December 3, 1924–September 6, 2008) was an American archaeologist, author, and the primary expert on the Cahokia mounds, the largest ancient metropolis in North America. Published books include Cahokia, the Great Native American Metropolis and The Cahokia Atlas: A Historical Atlas of Cahokia Archaeology.

== Life ==
In 1953, Fowler was awarded a PhD from the University of Chicago; he had already begun his work excavating the Modoc Rock Shelter at Modoc, Illinois. With support from the University of Wisconsin-Milwaukee, where he became a professor in 1966, Fowler led many of the excavations and discoveries at Cahokia. Today, the Cahokia Mounds State Historic Site is a 2,200-acre site that contains the ruins of a sophisticated prehistoric native civilization which existed from about 700 to 1400 AD. It was named a World Heritage Site by UNESCO in 1982.

Fowler was awarded the "distinguished career award" by The Midwest Archeological Conference in 2008.
