= List of archaeological sites in Tennessee =

The Tennessee Division of Archaeology maintains a database of all archaeological sites recorded within the state of Tennessee. As of January 1, 2009 this catalog contains more than 22,000 sites, including both prehistoric and historic resources. In Tennessee, Prehistoric is generally defined as the time between the appearance of the first people in the region (c. 12,000 BC) and the arrival of the first European explorers (c. 1540 AD). The Historic period begins after the arrival of those Europeans and continues to the present. Both these periods are further divided into subperiods and phases using established archaeological conventions for the region.

The following list of archaeological sites in Tennessee encompasses sites that have either contributed substantially or have the potential to contribute substantially to research regarding people who have lived in what is now Tennessee. Note that a historical site is not necessarily an archaeological site. According to the Tennessee Division of Archaeology Site Survey Record, official site numbers are generally assigned to historic sites only if artifacts and/or historic documentation for that site support a pre–1933 date. Historical sites are included in the following list only if archeological field work has been conducted at the site.

The term cultural affiliation refers to the archaeological period when a site was created and/or occupied. Many sites were occupied during more than one archaeological period, and are therefore known as multicomponent. An example of a multicomponent site would be American Civil War earthworks constructed at the same location as a prehistoric Mississippian village. The cultural affiliation category in the list below refers only to periods in which the most significant occupation or event (e.g., a battle) took place at the site.

Archaeological sites recorded in Tennessee are assigned State Trinomials consisting of letter and number combinations that indicate the state and county where the site is found, and includes a sequential number identifying the specific site. For example, the trinomial 40DV11 designates the eleventh archaeological site recorded in Davidson County (DV) , Tennessee (40) .

Legend for cultural affiliations:

- Paleoindian — roughly 12,000 BC (and possibly earlier) to 8000 BC
- Archaic — c. 8000 BC to 1000 BC
- Woodland — c. 1000 BC - 1000 AD
- Mississippian — c. 900 to 1600 AD
- Cherokee — affiliated with proto-historic and historic Cherokee occupation (c. 1600–1800)
- British colonial — affiliated with Euro-American expansion, pre-1776.
- American — affiliated with Euro-American occupation or events post-1776

The sites are listed alphabetically by county.

== Anderson County ==
Site	Designation	Cultural affiliation(s)	Year(s) excavated	Status
Lost Ridge Site	40AN1	Woodland, Mississippian	1960	
University of Tennessee Farm Site	40AN2	Archaic, Mississippian	1960	
Brushy Valley Site	40AN3		1960	
Holt Site	40AN4		1961	
County Farm/Braden Branch Site	40AN5		1960	
Worthington Branch Site	40AN6			
Freels Bend Site	40AN8		1960	
Hawkins Cave Site	40AN14		1934	
Johnson Farm Site	40AN15	Mississippian	1934	
Taylor Farm Site	40AN16		1934	
Lea Farm Site	40AN17		1934	
Cox Mound/Cox Village Site	40AN19	Mississippian	1934/1960	
Bull Bluff Site	40AN20	Woodland, Mississippian, Historic	1961	
Crawford Farm Mound	40AN21	Woodland	1938	
Freels Farm Mounds	40AN22	Woodland	1934	
Freels Cabin Site	40AN28	American pioneer	1977	DOE-owned
Carden Farm Site	40AN44		1990	
Eagle Bend Site	40AN45		1986	
Eagle Bend Site	40AN46		1986	
Eagle Bend Site	40AN47		1986	
Eagle Bend Site	40AN48		1986	
Eagle Bend Site	40AN49		1986	
Eagle Bend Site	40AN50		1986	
Eagle Bend Site	40AN51		1986	
Eagle Bend Site	40AN52		1986	
Clinton Site	40AN74	Woodland	1990s	

== Bedford County ==
Site	Designation	Cultural affiliation(s)	Year(s) excavated	Status
Owl Hollow/Raus Site	40BD46		1975	Submerged
Hendrixson Site	40BD47		1973	Submerged
Unnamed Site	40BD50		1975–1976	
Shoffner Site	40BD55	Woodland	1975	Submerged
Unnamed Site	40BD75		1973	
Unnamed Site	40BD123	Historic	1974–1975	

== Benton County ==
Site	Designation	Cultural affiliation(s)	Year(s) excavated	Status
General Surface and Shovel Tests	40BN1	Indeterminate Prehistoric, Indeterminate Historic	1990	
General Surface Collection	40BN2	Indeterminate Prehistoric, Indeterminate Historic	1990	
Danville Ferry Site	40BN3	Mississippian	1940	Submerged
Sulphur Creek Site	40BN7		1940	Submerged
Harmon's Creek Site	40BN8		1940	
Shoreline Surface	40BN10		1992	
Thomas Site	40BN11	Mississippian	1990	
Eva Site	40BN12	Archaic	1940	Submerged
Bridges Site	40BN13		1941	Submerged
Unnamed Site	40BN14		1980	
Unnamed Site	40BN16		1980	
West Cuba Landing Site	40BN17		1941	
Prevatt's/Pravatts Site	40BN20		1915	
Odle Site	40BN23		1941	
Ledbetter Site	40BN25	Archaic	1940	
Lick Creek Site	40BN30	Mississippian	1940	Submerged
Stockdale Site	40BN32	Woodland, Mississippian	1940, 1990	
Gatewood Site	40BN47	Mississippian	1940	
Frazier Site	64BN59		1941	
Young's Landing Site	40BN60		1941	
Earp Site	40BN68		1941	
Cherry Site	40BN74		1941	
McDaniel Site	40BN77		1941	
TVA General Survey	40BN123	Indeterminate Prehistoric	1990	
TVA General Survey	40BN124	Indeterminate Prehistoric	1990	
TVA General Survey	40BN125	Indeterminate Prehistoric	1990	
TVA General Survey	40BN129	Indeterminate Prehistoric	1992	
TVA Shoreline Survey	40BN125	Indeterminate Prehistoric	1990	
TVA General Survey	40BN132	Indeterminate Prehistoric	1990	
TVA General Survey	40BN134	Indeterminate Historical	1990	
TVA General Survey	40BN135	Indeterminate Prehistoric	1990	
TVA Shoreline Survey	40BN141	Indeterminate Prehistoric, Historic	1991	
TVA General Survey	40BN142	Indeterminate Prehistoric	1992	
TVA General Survey	40BN150	Indeterminate Prehistoric	1990	
TVA General Survey	40BN151	Indeterminate Prehistoric	1990	
General Surface Collection	40BN152	Indeterminate Historic	1990	
TVA General Survey	40BN153	Indeterminate Historic	1990	
TVA General Survey	40BN154	Indeterminate Historic	1990	
TVA General Survey	40BN155	Indeterminate Prehistoric	1990	
TVA General Survey	40BN156	Indeterminate Prehistoric	1990	
TVA General Survey	40BN157	Indeterminate Prehistoric	1990	
TVA General Survey	40BN158	Indeterminate Prehistoric	1990	
TVA General Survey	40BN159	Indeterminate Prehistoric	1990	
TVA General Survey	40BN160	Indeterminate Prehistoric	1990	
TVA General Survey	40BN161	Indeterminate Prehistoric	1990	
TVA General Survey	40BN162	Indeterminate Prehistoric	1990	
TVA General Survey	40BN164	Indeterminate Historic	1990	
TVA General Survey	40BN165	Indeterminate Prehistoric, Indeterminate Historic	1990	
TVA General Survey	40BN166	Indeterminate Prehistoric	1990	
TVA General Survey	40BN167	Indeterminate Prehistoric	1990	
TVA General Survey	40BN168	Indeterminate Prehistoric	1990	
TVA General Survey	40BN169	Indeterminate Historic	1990	
TVA General Survey	40BN171	Indeterminate Prehistoric	1990	
TVA General Survey	40BN172	Indeterminate Prehistoric	1990	
TVA General Survey	40BN173	Indeterminate Prehistoric, Indeterminate Historic	1990	
TVA General Survey	40BN174	Indeterminate Prehistoric, Indeterminate Historic	1990	
TVA General Survey	40BN175	Indeterminate Prehistoric, Indeterminate Historic	1990	
TVA General Survey	40BN177	Indeterminate Prehistoric	1990	
TVA General Survey	40BN177	Indeterminate Prehistoric	1990	
TVA General Survey	40BN178	Indeterminate Prehistoric	1990	
TVA General Survey	40BN179	Indeterminate Prehistoric	1990	
TVA General Survey	40BN177	Indeterminate Prehistoric, Indeterminate Historic	1990	
TVA General Survey	40BN178	Indeterminate Prehistoric	1990	
TVA General Survey	40BN177	Indeterminate Prehistoric	1990	
TVA General Survey	40BN178	Indeterminate Prehistoric	1990	
TVA General Survey	40BN179	Indeterminate Prehistoric	1990	
TVA General Survey	40BN180	Indeterminate Prehistoric, Indeterminate Historic	1990	
TVA General Survey	40BN181	Indeterminate Prehistoric	1990	
TVA General Survey	40BN182	Indeterminate Prehistoric	1990	
TVA General Survey	40BN183	Indeterminate Historic	1990	
TVA General Survey	40BN184	Woodland	1990	
TVA General Survey	40BN185	Indeterminate Prehistoric	1990	
TVA General Survey	40BN186	Indeterminate Prehistoric	1990	
TVA General Survey	40BN188	Indeterminate Prehistoric	1990	
Carson-Conn-Short Site	40BN190	Paleoindian	1990s	
TVA General Survey	40BN191	Indeterminate Prehistoric	1991	
TVA General Survey	40BN192	Indeterminate Prehistoric	1991	
TVA General Survey	40BN193	Indeterminate Prehistoric	1991	
TVA General Survey	40BN194	Indeterminate Prehistoric	1991	
TVA General Survey	40BN195	Indeterminate Prehistoric	1991	
TVA General Survey	40BN198	Indeterminate Prehistoric	1991	
TVA General Survey	40BN199	Indeterminate Prehistoric	1991	
TVA General Survey	40BN224	Indeterminate Prehistoric	1991	
TVA General Survey	40BN225	Indeterminate Prehistoric	1991	

== Bledsoe County ==
Site	Designation	Cultural affiliation(s)	Year(s) excavated	Status
Hemphill Cemetery Site	40BS31	Late 19th-Early 20th century	1986	
H. H. Beach Cemetery Site	40BS32	ca. 1865	1986	
Cemetery Site	40BS33	Historic	1986	
Gilbert Gaul House Site	40BS34	Late 19th-Early 20th century	1986	
Newton's Ford and Stave Mill Site	40BS35	Late 19th-Early 20th century	1986	
Lewis Keedy House Site	40BS36	Mid-Late 19th century	1986	

== Blount County ==
Site	Designation	Cultural affiliation(s)	Year(s) excavated	Status
Prater Site	40BT2		1942	
Chilhowee	40BT7	Cherokee	1950s	Submerged
Tallassee	40BT8	Cherokee	1955–1957	Submerged
Peter Cable Complex	40BT34	American pioneer		National park
	40BT47	Woodland, Mississippian	c. 1990	
John Oliver Complex	40BT55	American pioneer	1980s	National park
Kinzel Springs Site	40BT89	Archaic, Woodland, Mississippian, Cherokee	1999–2001	
Apple Barn Site	40BT90	Archaic, Woodland, Mississippian, Cherokee	1999–2001	
Pony Ride Site	40BT91	Woodland, Mississippian, Cherokee, American	1999–2001	
Gas Company Site	40BT94	Woodland	1999–2001	
Sparks Bottom Site	40BT129	Archaic, Woodland		National park
Chestnut Flats	40BT133	Archaic, American pioneer		National park
Spence Field	40BT138			National park
Indian Grave Gap	40BT140			National park
Gregory Cave	40BT141	Woodland, Mississippian		National park

== Bradley County ==
Site	Designation	Cultural affiliation(s)	Year(s) excavated	Status
Rymer Site	40BY11	Mississippian	1937	
Ledford Island	40BY13	Mississippian	1938–1939	
Candy Creek	40BY14	Woodland	1939	
Rymer Site	40BY15	Mississippian	1937	
Varnell	40BY18	Woodland	1939	
Chatata				

== Campbell County ==
Site	Designation	Cultural affiliation(s)	Year(s) excavated	Status
Heatherly Stone Mounds	40CP1	Woodland	1934	
Bowman Farm Site	40CP2	Mississippian	1934	
Saltpeter Cave	40CP3	Woodland	1934	
McCarty Farm	40CP4		1934	
Irvin Village	40CP5	Mississippian	1934	
Richardson Farm	40CP8		1934	
Harris Farm Site	40CP9	Mississippian	1934	
Wallace Cave	40CP12		1934	
Bullock Cave	40CP13		1934	
Fincastle Site	40CP19			
Chambers Creek Shelter Site	40CP20		1951	

== Cannon County ==
Site	Designation	Cultural affiliation(s)	Year(s) excavated	Status
Mountain Creek Survey	40CN1	Archaic	1963	
Mountain Creek Survey	40CN2	Archaic	1963	
Mountain Creek Survey	40CN3	Archaic, Woodland	1963	
Hoover-Beeson Rockshelter	40CN4		1963	

== Carroll County ==
Site	Designation	Cultural affiliation(s)	Year(s) excavated	Status
Chandler Site	40CL64	Woodland	1991	
Glisson Site	40CL65	Archaic	1991	

== Carter County ==
Site	Designation	Cultural affiliation(s)	Year(s) excavated	Status
Fudd-Campbell Site	40CR3	Woodland	1962, 1980–1981	

== Cheatham County ==
Site	Designation	Cultural affiliation(s)	Year(s) excavated	Status
Pack Site	40CH1	Mississippian	1936	
Woodard Mound	40CH3	Woodland	1936	
Mound Bottom	40CH8	Woodland, Mississippian	1936, 1940	State archaeological site
Mound Bottom	40CH10		1936, 1940	
Mound Bottom	40CH11			State archaeological site
Ashland Bridge Site	40CH73		1983-1984	
Patterson Forge	40CH87	American industry		State park

== Chester County ==
Site	Designation	Cultural affiliation(s)	Year(s) excavated	Status
Pierce Site	40CS24a	Paleo-Indian	1970s	

== Claiborne County ==
Site	Designation	Cultural affiliation(s)	Year(s) excavated	Status
Ausmus Farm	40CE10		1934	
Ausmus Cave	40CE20	Mississippian	1934	
Cheek Site	40CE28	Archaic, Woodland		
Doug Young Site	40CE56	Woodland		
Essary Site	40CE40	Archaic		
Tazewell Fortification	40CE109			

== Clay County ==
Site	Designation	Cultural affiliation(s)	Year(s) excavated	Status
Stardust Sites I-III	40CY63-65	Archaic, Woodland	2001	

== Cocke County ==
Site	Designation	Cultural affiliation(s)	Year(s) excavated	Status
Dutch Bottom Site	40CK4			
Ranklin Site	40CK6	Archaic, Woodland	1960	
Del Rio Site	40CK7	Woodland	1968	
Bible Site	40CK11	Woodland	1966	
Swaggerty Blockhouse	40CK201	American pioneer/American agricultural	2001	Private property

== Coffee County ==
Site	Designation	Cultural affiliation(s)	Year(s) excavated	Status
Old Stone Fort	40CF1	Woodland	1966	State Park
Hickerson Site	40CF2	Archaic, Woodland, Mississippian	1971–1975	
Powers IV	40CF3	Archaic, Woodland, Mississippian	1971–1975	
Powers V	40CF4	Archaic, Woodland, Mississippian	1971–1975	
Parks Site	40CF5	Archaic, Woodland, Mississippian	1966–1967, 1971–1975	
York Site	40CF10	Archaic, Woodland, Mississippian	1972–1975	
Eoff I/Neal I	40CF32	Archaic, Woodland, Mississippian	1973, 1975	
Banks I	40CF34	Archaic, Woodland, Mississippian	1972, 1974–1975	
Nowlin II	40CF35	Archaic, Woodland, Mississippian	1972, 1974–1975	
Jernigan I	40CF36	Archaic, Woodland, Mississippian	1974	
Jernigan II	40CF37	Archaic, Woodland, Mississippian	1973–1974	
Neel II	40CF40	Archaic, Woodland, Mississippian	1972	
Rhoton Cave	40CF46	Archaic, Woodland, Mississippian	1972	
Riddle Site	40CF59	Archaic, Woodland, Mississippian	1973, 1975	
Hicks I	40CF62	Archaic, Woodland, Mississippian	1972–1973	
Boyd I	40CF68	Archaic, Woodland, Mississippian	1973	
Aaron Shelter	40CF69	Archaic, Woodland, Mississippian	1975	
Sterling Shelter	40CF73	Archaic, Woodland, Mississippian	1973	
Davidson Branch	40CF74	Archaic, Woodland, Mississippian	1973–1974	
Wiser I	40CF80	Archaic, Woodland, Mississippian	1977	
Wiser-Stephens I	40CF81	Archaic, Woodland, Mississippian	1973, 1975, 1976	
Blanton III	40CF82	Archaic, Woodland, Mississippian	1975	
Richardson-Soesbe	40CF88	Archaic, Woodland, Mississippian	1973–1974	
Duke I	40CF97	Archaic, Woodland, Mississippian	1973, 1975	
Barton Site	40CF102	Archaic, Woodland, Mississippian	1972	
Anthony Site II	40CF104	Archaic, Woodland, Mississippian	1973–1974	
Eoff III	40CF107	Archaic, Woodland, Mississippian	1973	
Bank III	40CF108	Archaic, Woodland, Mississippian	1972–1973	
Banks V	40CF111	Archaic, Woodland, Mississippian	1973–1974	
Banks II	40CF113	Archaic, Woodland, Mississippian	1973–1974	
Ewell III	40CF118	Archaic, Woodland, Mississippian	1974	
Cascade Distillery Site	40CF237	American industry		

== Crockett County ==
Site	Designation	Cultural affiliation(s)	Year(s) excavated	Status
Unnamed Camp Site	40CT9	Archaic	1985	
Unnamed Camp Site	40CT10	Archaic	1985	

== Davidson County ==
Site	Designation	Cultural affiliation(s)	Year(s) excavated	Status
Buchi Site	40DV1		1936	
Hermann SIAS#96	40DV2		1972	
Noel Stone-Grave Cemetery/Cain's Chapel	40DV3		1981	
East Nashville Mounds	40DV4	Mississippian	1868, 1992	
French Lick	40DV5	Archaic, Woodland, Mississippian	1821, 1860s, 1880s, 1992, 2014	Mississippian features partially excavated during construction of First Tennessee Ball Park in 2014. Parts of the site are intact.
Widemeier Site	40DV9	Paleo-Indian, Archaic		
Traveller's Rest	40DV11	Mississippian		
West Site	40DV12	Mississippian	1964–1970	
J. Percy Priest Survey Site	40DV18		1963	
J. Percy Priest Survey Site	40DV19		1963	
J. Percy Priest Survey Site	40DV20		1963	
J. Percy Priest Survey Site	40DV21		1963	
J. Percy Priest Survey Site	40DV22		1963	
J. Percy Priest Survey Site	40DV23		1963	
J. Percy Priest Survey Site	40DV24		1963	
J. Percy Priest Survey Site	40DV25		1963	
Prison Farm "B"	40DV35	Archaic, Mississippian	1969	
Brick Church Pike Site	40DV39	Mississippian	1878, 1969, 1973	
Brick Church Mound and Village Site	40DV39	Mississippian	1877, 1969, 1971–2001	Destroyed for residential development
First American Cave, Regions Center (Nashville)	40DV40	Ice Age fauna, Woodland	1971	
The Hermitage	40DV100	American plantation		Museum
The Ensworth School	40DV184	Paleoindian, Archaic, Mississippian	2003	Destroyed
Kelley's Battery	40DV392	Mississippian, American military		
Drennon Site	40DV447	Archaic, Woodland		
Hermitage Springs	40DV551	Archaic, Woodland		

== Decatur County ==
Site	Designation	Cultural affiliation(s)	Year(s) excavated	Status
Oak View Landing Site	40DR1		1941	
Hog Creek Site	40DR2	Woodland	1941	
TVA General Survey Site	40DR3		1991	
Burton's Landing Site	40DR1	Woodland	1941	
TVA General Survey Site	40DR8		1991	
Carrington Site	40DR11	Woodland	1941	
TVA General Survey Site	40DR14		1991	
TVA General Survey Site	40DR15		1991	
Burnt Under Bridge Site	40DR17		1941	
Lower Sellpaws Site	40DR25		1941	
Sam Gotham Site	40DR26		1941	
West Britt's Landing Site	40DR43	Woodland	1941	
Burton's Spring Site	40DR62		1941	
Beech River Site	40DR69		1966	
Beech River Site	40DR70		1966	

== Fayette County ==
Site	Designation	Cultural affiliation(s)	Year(s) excavated	Status
Ames Plantation Site	40FY2	Historic	1963, 1969	
Lucky 7 Site	40FY436	Woodland		

== Franklin County ==
Site	Designation	Cultural affiliation(s)	Year(s) excavated	Status
Owl Hollow	40FR7	Woodland	1966	Submerged
Mason Site	40FR8	Archaic, Woodland	1966	Submerged
Rollins I Site	40FR9	Archaic	1966	Submerged
Rollins II Site	40FR10	Archaic	1966	Submerged
Hopkins Site	40FR11	Archaic, Woodland	1966	Submerged
Willis Lake Bridge I Site	40FR12	Archaic	1966	Submerged
Brickyard Site	40FR13	Paleoindian, Archaic, Woodland, Mississippian	1966–1967	Submerged
Willis Lake Bridge II Site	40FR14	Archaic	1966	Submerged
Willis Lake Bridge III Site	40FR15	Archaic	1966	Submerged
Tucker Rock Shelter	40FR16	Archaic, Woodland	1966	Submerged
Wiseman Cave Site	40FR17	Indeterminate Prehistoric	1966	Submerged
Spencer I Site	40FR18	Archaic	1966	Submerged
Spencer II Site	40FR19	Archaic	1966	Submerged
Grammer Site	40FR20	Woodland	1966	Submerged
Anderson Site	40FR27	Paleoindian, Archaic	1966	Submerged
Wiseman Shelter Site	40FR37		1966	Submerged
Petersburg Site	40FR42	Archaic	1966	Submerged
Salvage Site	40FR47	Woodland	1970	Submerged
Griffin Rockshelter Site	40FR151	Woodland, Mississippian	1974	

== Gibson County ==
Site	Designation	Cultural affiliation(s)	Year(s) excavated	Status
Unnamed Site	40GB41	Paleoindian	1991	
Blackmore Mound	40GB42	Archaic, Woodland, Mississippian	1991	

== Giles County ==
Site	Designation	Cultural affiliation(s)	Year(s) excavated	Status
Parker's Pasture	40GL25	Mississippian		
Elk River Fortification	40GL54	Archaic, Woodland, Mississippian, American military (Civil War)	None	Private
Johnson May Site	40GL85	Woodland		

== Greene County ==
Site	Designation	Cultural affiliation(s)	Year(s) excavated	Status
Camp Creek Site	40GN1	Archaic, Woodland	1956–1957	
Lick Creek Site	40GN2	Woodland		
Surface Survey Site	40GN3			
Surface Survey Site	40GN4			
Surface Survey Site	40GN5			
Ebenezer Site	40GN6	Woodland	1956, 1967	
Chiaha Site	40GN9			
Wilhoite Site	40GN10			
Yellow House Site	40GN11			
Davy Crockett Birthplace	40GN12	Woodland, American pioneer	1977	State park
Birdwell Site	40GN228	Archaic, Woodland, Mississippian		
Neas Site	40GN229	Archaic, Woodland		
Samuel Doak Plantation	40GN257	American pioneer		

== Grundy County ==
Site	Designation	Cultural affiliation(s)	Year(s) excavated	Status
Ravens Cliff Site	40GY3			
Testing Provenience Site	40GY11		1973	
Testing Provenience Site	40GY14		1973	

== Hamilton County ==
Site	Designation	Cultural affiliation(s)	Year(s) excavated	Status
Dallas Island	40HA1	Woodland, Mississippian	1930s	Submerged
Davis Site	40HA2		1936	
Hixon Site	40HA3	Mississippian	1930s	
Sale Creek Site	40HA10		1937	
LeCroy Site	40HA43	Mississippian	1940s, 1950s	
Moccasin Bend	40HA63	Archaic, Woodland, Mississippian	1964	National Archaeological District, part of Chickamauga and Chattanooga National Military Park
MacLellan Island	40HA64	Archaic, Woodland		Owned by Audubon Society
Citico	40HA65	Mississippian	1915; 1979	Threatened with housing development
Audubon Acres	40HA84	Mississippian		Owned by Audubon Society
Vulcan Archaeological Site	40HA140	Archaic, Woodland, Mississippian		
Hampton Place Archaeological Site	40HA146	Archaic, Woodland, Mississippian		Part of Moccasin Bend National Archaeological District, part of Chickamauga and Chattanooga National Military Park
Mallards Dozen Archaeological Site	40HA147	Archaic, Woodland		part of Moccasin Bend National Archaeological District, part of Chickamauga and Chattanooga National Military Park
David Davis Site	40HA301	Mississippian	2008	Destroyed for industrial development; location of material collected unknown
Woodland Mound Archaeological District		Woodland		on state property

== Hardeman County ==
Site	Designation	Cultural affiliation(s)	Year(s) excavated	Status
Davis Bridge Battlefield	40HM106	American military		

== Hardin County ==
Site	Designation	Cultural affiliation(s)	Year(s) excavated	Status
Swallow Bluff Island Mounds	40HR16	Mississippian	2003	Private
Shiloh Battlefield Site	40HR179	American military		national military park
Shiloh Indian Mounds		Woodland, Mississippian		National historic landmark

The Holliston Mills site, a Mississippian town in Upper East Tennessee, is located on the north bank of the Holston River south of Kingsport in Hawkins County, Tennessee. The site was excavated by members of the Tennessee Archaeological Society between 1968 and 1972. It was excavated in ten-foot blocks using six-inch levels, revealing a large late prehistoric (and perhaps protohistoric) town represented by at least two palisades, more than 660 burials, a large public structure, and several smaller domestic structures. The excavators initially reported the recovery of what they believed to be Cobb Island pottery in the plow zone and much Dallas material from the level excavations, but they also noted that the site had been looted prior to their excavations. There is little, if any, Cobb Island pottery, but there are some Pisgah ceramics.

== Hawkins County ==
Site	Designation	Cultural affiliation(s)	Year(s) excavated	Status
Holliston Mills Site	40HW11	Mississippian	1968–1972	

== Henderson County ==
Site	Designation	Cultural affiliation(s)	Year(s) excavated	Status
Parker's Crossroads Battlefield	40HE118	American military		

== Henry County ==
Site	Designation	Cultural affiliation(s)	Year(s) excavated	Status
Williams Site	40HY1		1939	
Centerville Landing Site	40HY4		1939	
Thompson Village	40HY5	Woodland, Mississippian	1939	
McAdoo Site	40HY10	Archaic, Woodland	1939	
Kays Landing Site	40HY13		1940	
Obion Mounds	40HY14	Mississippian	1940	
Big Sandy Site	40HY18		1940	

== Hickman County ==
Site	Designation	Cultural affiliation(s)	Year(s) excavated	Status
Gordon Site		Paleo-Indian, Archaic, Woodland		
Oldroy Site	40HI131	Paleo-Indian, Archaic, Woodland		
Mayberry Site	40HI133	Paleo-Indian, Archaic, Woodland		

== Humphreys County ==
Site	Designation	Cultural affiliation(s)	Year(s) excavated	Status
Slayden Site	40HS1	Mississippian	1935	
Bone Site	40HS2		1935	
Rice Site	40HS3	Mississippian	1935	
Link Farm Site	40HS6	Mississippian	1936, 1963	
Patterson Site	40HS12	Mississippian	1942	
Hobbs Site	40HS60	Mississippian	1942	
Nuckolls Site	40HS60	Paleo-Indian		
Johnsonville Site	40HS159	Historic	1982–1984	
Fairchance Furnace Site	40HS168	American industry		
Johnsonville Battlefield		American military		State park

== Jackson County ==
Site	Designation	Cultural affiliation(s)	Year(s) excavated	Status
Fort Blount	40JK125	American frontier, Middle Woodland	1989–1994	
Austin Peay Bridge Site	40JK129	Archaic		
Moore Bottom	40JK145	Archaic		

== Jefferson County ==
Site	Designation	Cultural affiliation(s)	Year(s) excavated	Status
Fains Island Site	40JE1	Mississippian	1935	
Zimmerman's Island Site	40JE2	Mississippian	1942	Submerged
Indian Walk Shoals Site	40JE9			
McBee Mound/Loy Site	40JE10		1980–1990	
Taylor Bend Site	40JE25	Archaic	1973	
Taylor Bend Site	40JE26	Archaic	1973	
Strawberry Plains Fortification Site	40JE41-44	American military		

== Johnson County ==
Site	Designation	Cultural affiliation(s)	Year(s) excavated	Status
Wagner Island Site	40JN89		1984	
Wagner Island Site	40JN90		1984	
Lake Hole Cave	40JN159	Mississippian	1990s	National forest

== Knox County ==
Site	Designation	Cultural affiliation(s)	Year(s) excavated	Status
Copper Ridge	40KN2		1961	
Looney Island Village Midden	40KN4		1961	
Henson Spring Branch	40KN5	Woodland	1951	
Blow's Bend	40KN9	Woodland	1958, 1966	
Surface Collection	40KN10	Woodland	1966	
Grant Island	40KN11		1914, 1942	
Cox Island	40KN12		1914, 1964	
Topside Tip	40KN13	Archaic, Woodland, Mississippian	1952	
Little River Shoals	40KN14		1955–1967	
Sequoyah Hills Mound/Fischer	40KN15	Woodland, Mississippian	1914, 1953	
U.T. Agriculture Farm Mound	40KN16	Woodland		
Post Oak Island	40KN23	Mississippian		Submerged
Copper Ridge	40KN25	Woodland	1961	Submerged
Cruikshank Bend	40KN27		1961	
Peak Site	40KN28		1961	
Bowling Site	40KN29		1961	
Surface Collection	40KN31	Archaic, Woodland	1961	
Lyons Island	40KN36	Woodland	1958, 1966, 1975	
Montgomery Site	40KN39	Woodland	1961	
Cherokee Farm Site	40KN45	Archaic, Woodland, Historic	1960s	
Boyd Island Site	40KN47	Archaic, Woodland	1961, 1965	
Webster Site	40KN49	Archaic	1961	
Hansard Farm Site	40KN51	Mississippian	1973	
Surface Collection	40KN54	Archaic, Woodland	1975, 1981	
Surface Collection	40KN65	Woodland, Historic	1981	
Surface Collection	40KN73	Archaic, Woodland	1983	
Mabry House/Pace House	40KN86		1995	
Tyson Park	40KN119	Historic	1984	
Ramsey House	40KN120	American plantation	1995	Museum
Marble Springs	40KN125	American pioneer		State historic site
Matt Russell House	40KN127	Historic	1988	
Surface Collection	40KN132	Archaic, Woodland	1961	
Sevierville Hill Site	40KN142	American military		
Courthouse Block Site	40KN145	Historic	1996	
Bull Run No. 1 Site	40KN181	Archaic, Woodland	1988	
Bull Run No. 2 Site	40KN192	Archaic	1988	
Bull Run No. 19 Site	40KN193	Indeterminate Prehistoric	1988	
Caylor Site	40KN266		1961	
William Blount Mansion		American pioneer		National Historic Landmark

== Lake County ==
Site	Designation	Cultural affiliation(s)	Year(s) excavated	Status
Foxhole Site	40LK10	Mississippian		
Cremaillere Line Fortification	40LK54	American military		

== Lauderdale County ==
Site	Designation	Cultural affiliation(s)	Year(s) excavated	Status
Fort Pillow	40LA50	American military		state park

== Lincoln County ==
Site	Designation	Cultural affiliation(s)	Year(s) excavated	Status
Huntland Site	40LN1	Archaic, Woodland	1966	

== Loudon County ==
Site	Designation	Cultural affiliation(s)	Year(s) excavated	Status
Bussell Island	40LD17	Archaic, Woodland, Mississippian, Cherokee	1970s	Location of Tellico Dam
Mainland Village	40LD18	Mississippian	1980–1981	
Bat Creek Site	40LD24	Mississippian	1971	Partially submerged
Jackson Bend Mound Site	40LD35	Paleoindian, Archaic, Woodland, Mississippian, Cherokee, Historic	1977	
Bacon Farm Site	40LD35	Archaic	1976	
Iddins Site	40LD38	Archaic	1970s	
Henry Site	40LD53	Paleoindian, Archaic, Woodland, Mississippian, Cherokee, Historic	1981	
Morganton	40LD105	American river town	1978	Submerged
Wear Bend Site	40LD107	Cherokee	1979	Submerged
Lay Site	40LD127	Paleoindian, Archaic, Woodland, Mississippian, Cherokee, Historic	1977	Submerged
Tipton-Dixon House	40LD179	Woodland		
Kittrell Mound	40LD183		1985	
Kimberly-Clark Site	40LD208	Mississippian	1989	
Loudon Fortification	40LD211-212, etc.	American military		

== Macon County ==
Site	Designation	Cultural affiliation(s)	Year(s) excavated	Status
Bugtussle	40MC1	American military	1983	

== Madison County ==
Site	Designation	Cultural affiliation(s)	Year(s) excavated	Status
Pinson Mounds	40MD1	Woodland	1960s, 1970s, 1980s	State archaeological park
Johnston Mound Complex	40MD3	Woodland		
Cochran Site	40MD23	Archaic, Woodland	1970s	Grouped with Pinson Mounds
Denmark Mound Group	40MD85	Mississippian		

== Marion County ==
Site	Designation	Cultural affiliation(s)	Year(s) excavated	Status
Pittman-Alder	40MI5	Archaic, Woodland	1964	Submerged
Westmoreland-Barber	40MI11	Archaic, Woodland, Mississippian	1964	Submerged
Bible	40MI15	Archaic, Woodland, Mississippian	1965	Submerged
Lay	40MI20	Woodland	1965	Submerged
Nickajack Cave	40MI108		1960s	Submerged

== McMinn County ==
Site	Designation	Cultural affiliation(s)	Year(s) excavated	Status
Mouse Creek Site	40MN3	Woodland, Mississippian	1930s, 1980s	

== McNairy County ==
Site	Designation	Cultural affiliation(s)	Year(s) excavated	Status
Big Hill Pond Fortification	40MY95	American military		
Wray's Bluff Fortification	40MY111	American military		

== Meigs County ==
Site	Designation	Cultural affiliation(s)	Year(s) excavated	Status
Hiwassee Island	40MG31	Mississippian	1930s	state wildlife refuge

== Monroe County ==
Site	Designation	Cultural affiliation(s)	Year(s) excavated	Status
Fort Loudoun	40MR1	English colonial military	1936, 1975–1976	Original site raised with fill; fort reconstructed
Chota	40MR2	Cherokee	1939, 1969, 1970, 1973, 1974	Submerged; monument in raised area
Mialoquo	40MR3	Cherokee	1977	Submerged
Tomotley	40MR5	Mississippian, Cherokee	1967, 1973, 1974, 1976	Submerged
Toqua	40MR6	Mississippian, Cherokee	1975–1978	Submerged
Citico	40MR7	Archaic, Mississippian, Cherokee	1967–1968, 1978	Submerged
Halfway Town	40MR8	Cherokee	1970s	Submerged
Great Tellico/Chatuga	40MR12	Cherokee		
Pate Mound	40MR16		1981	
Galyon Farm	40MR19		1967	
Martin Farm Site	40MR20	Mississippian	1967–1968, 1975	Submerged
Harrison Branch	40MR21	Archaic, Woodland	1971, 1975	Submerged
Icehouse Bottom	40MR23	Archaic, Woodland	1969, 1970–1971, 1975, 1977	Submerged
John Carson Site	40MR24	Historic Overhill Cherokee	1967, 1977	
Bacon Bend Site	40MR25	Archaic, Woodland	1967, 1977	Submerged
Mayfield I	40MR26		1967	
Mayfield II	40MR27		1967	
McGhee Cabin	40MR30		1967, 1973	
Starnes-Kahite	40MR32	Cherokee	1967–1968	
Patrick Site	40MR40	Archaic, Woodland	1972–1973, 1975	
Calloway Island	40MR41	Archaic, Woodland	1976	Submerged
Rose Island	40MR44	Archaic, Woodland	1973–1974	submerged
Patrick Quarry Site	40MR45		1979	
Hodge Site	40MR46		1973	
Tuskegee	40MR24, 40MR64	Cherokee	1975	Submerged
Tellico Blockhouse	40MR50	American military	1972–1974	State park
Tanasi	40MR62	Cherokee	1962	Submerged; marked by monument
Howard Site	40MR66	Archiac	1976	
Peery I Site	40MR67		1976	
Virginia Fort	40MR71	English colonial military	1976	
Jones Ferry Site	40MR76		1976, 1979	
Bell Rattle	40MR211		1981	
Sloane Bridge Site	40MR226		1981	

== Montgomery County ==
Site	Designation	Cultural affiliation(s)	Year(s) excavated	Status
Dunbar Cave	40MT43	Archaic, Woodland, Mississippian		State park
Riverview Mounds	40MT44	Mississippian		
Fort Defiance/Fort Bruce	40MT287	American military		

== Morgan County ==
Site	Designation	Cultural affiliation(s)	Year(s) excavated	Status
Faust Shelter	40MO8	Woodland, Mississippian	1965	
Prison Hill Site	40MO161	Woodland, Mississippian		part of Brushy Mountain prison complex

== Obion County ==
Site	Designation	Cultural affiliation(s)	Year(s) excavated	Status
Kenton Mound Group	40OB4	Mississippian	1991	
Oliver Site	40OB161	Woodland, Mississippian	1991	

== Perry County ==
Site	Designation	Cultural affiliation(s)	Year(s) excavated	Status
Sanford Rock	40PY1		1936	

== Pickett County ==
Site	Designation	Cultural affiliation(s)	Year(s) excavated	Status
Huddleston-Little Cabin	40PT38	American pioneer		
Smyrna Schoolhouse	40PT39	American pioneer		

== Polk County ==
Site	Designation	Cultural affiliation(s)	Year(s) excavated	Status
Ocoee	40PK1	Woodland, Mississippian, Cherokee	1930s	
Hiwassee Old Town	40PK3	Woodland, Mississippian, Cherokee	1980s	

== Putnam County ==
Site	Designation	Cultural affiliation(s)	Year(s) excavated	Status
Atkins Site	40PM85		1992	
Bilbrey Site	40PM89		1992	
Wiley Site	40PM90		1992	

== Rhea County ==
Site	Designation	Cultural affiliation(s)	Year(s) excavated	Status
Upper Hampton Farm Site	40RH1	Mississippian	1914	
Leuty Site	40RH6	Archaic, Woodland, Mississippian	1940	
McDonald Site	40RH7		1940	
McDonald Place Mound Site	40RH11		1914, 1987–1988	
Abel Farm Site	40RH12	Mississippian	1987–1988	
Butler Place Mounds Site	40RH14	Mississippian	1914, 1987–1988	
Biss Place Mounds Site	40RH15	Mississippian	1914, 1987–1988	
Long Island Mounds Site	40RH17		1914	
Hood Place Mound Site	40RH20	Mississippian	1914, 1987–1988	
Ewings Place Mounds Site	40RH21		1914	
Evans Place Mounds Site	40RH23		1914, 1987–1988	
Huffine Ferry Mounds Site	40RH24		1914, 1987–1988	
Cave Creek Mounds Site	40RH26		1914	
Spence Place Mounds Site	40RH28		1914, 1987–1988	
Hoyal Ferry Mounds Site	40RH29		1914, 1987–1988	
Gillespie Landing Mounds Site	40RH30	Mississippian	1914, 1987–1988	
Mounds near mouth of Mud Creek Site	40RH32		1914	
Hiwassee Garrison Site	40RH35	American pioneer		
Spivey Site	40RH39	Woodland	1940	
Hampton Site	40RH41	Archaic, Woodland, Mississippian	1914, 1940	
Smith Site	40RH42	Woodland	1940	
Wheelock Place Mounds Site	40RH43		1914	
Kimborough Place Mounds Site	40RH45		1914	
Red Cloud Ferry Mound Site	40RH46		1914	
Hope Place Mounds Site	40RH47		1914	
Cagle Place Mounds Site	40RH48		1914	
Watts Bar Waste Site	40RH64		1979	

== Roane County ==
Site	Designation	Cultural affiliation(s)	Year(s) excavated	Status
Bell Site	40RE1	Archaic, Woodland, Mississippian, Historic	1935	
Alford Site	40RE4	Woodland	1940	
Wilson Site	40RE6	Woodland	1972	
Montgomery Site	40RE8	Mississippian	1972	
Dearmond Site	40RE12	Woodland	1940	
Long Island Site	40RE17	Mississippian	1941	
Thief's Neck Site	40RE19	Mississippian	1942	
Jones Island Site	40RE28	Woodland	1982	
Tarwater Site	40RE33		1941	
Dave DeArmond Site	40RE53		1941	
Hensley Site	40RE33	Woodland	1941, 1974	
Powell Site	40RE99	Woodland	1972	
Elben Cave Site	40RE118		1964	
Fort Southwest Point	40RE119	American military	1970s, 1980s	Museum
Davis-Noe Site	40RE137	Mississippian		
Black Creek Furnace Site	40RE150		1965	
Red Velvet Spider Rockshelter	40RE243	Woodland		

== Rutherford County ==
Site	Designation	Cultural affiliation(s)	Year(s) excavated	Status
Sam Davis Home	40RD23	American plantation		
Stones River Battlefield	40RD177	American military		National battlefield

== Sequatchie County ==
Site	Designation	Cultural affiliation(s)	Year(s) excavated	Status
Hudlow Site	40SQ5		1973	

== Sevier County ==
Site	Designation	Cultural affiliation(s)	Year(s) excavated	Status				
McMahan Mound Site	40SV1	Mississippian	1984–1987					
Henderson Site	40SV4	Mississippian	1969		McCroskey Island	40SV43	Archaic, Woodland, Mississippian	1987, 1993, 1996
Lawson Home Site	40SV51							

== Shelby County ==
Site	Designation	Cultural affiliation(s)	Year(s) excavated	Status
Chucalissa	40SY1	Mississippian		state park
Hilderbrand House	40SY615	American plantation		

== Smith County ==
Site	Designation	Cultural affiliation(s)	Year(s) excavated	Status
Beasley Mounds Site	40SM43	Mississippian	1895	
Battery Knob Earthworks	40SM134	American military		

== Stewart County ==
Site	Designation	Cultural affiliation(s)	Year(s) excavated	Status
Gray Farm Site	40SW1	Woodland	1939	
Standing Rock Site	40SW2	Woodland, Mississippian	1939	
Leatherwood Creek Site	40SW13		1990	
Indian Bluff Site	40SW20	Mississippian	1939	
Bellwood Furnace Site	40SW21			
Stone Site	40SW23		1959	
Hogan Site	40SW23		1962	
Wallace Site	40SW32		1962	
Buchanan Site	40SW33		1962	
Rails Site	40SW33		1959	
Shamble Mound Site	40SW41	Woodland, Mississippian	1959	
Brake Site	40SW43		1962	
Allen Site	40SW47		1959, 1962	
Coleson Site	40SW52		1962	
Gafford Site	40SW59		1962	
Hamilton Site	40SW60		1962	
Brigham's Site	40SW69	Mississippian	1962	
Wells Creek Crater	40SW73	Paleo Indian	1960s	Can drive through

Eastman Rockshelter Sullivan County, TN

== Sullivan County ==
Site	Designation	Cultural affiliation(s)	Year(s) excavated	Status
Linville Cave	40SL24	Woodland		
Cain/Wolford Site	40SL31		1975	Submerged

== Sumner County ==
Site	Designation	Cultural affiliation(s)	Year(s) excavated	Status
Bledsoe's Station	40SU32	American pioneer	1990s	Public park
Camp Trousdale Site	40SU107	American military		
Castalian Springs	40SU14	Paleo-Indian, Archaic, Woodland, Mississippian		
Rutherford-Kizer Mound Group	40SU15	Mississippian		
Wynnewood	40SU75			state historic site

== Tipton County ==
Site	Designation	Cultural affiliation(s)	Year(s) excavated	Status
Island 35 Mastodon	40TP84	Pleistocene Faunal	1900	Destroyed

== Trousdale County ==
Site	Designation	Cultural affiliation(s)	Year(s) excavated	Status
Ken Farm/Lock#6 Quarry Site	40TR90	Historic	2015	

== Union County ==
Site	Designation	Cultural affiliation(s)	Year(s) excavated	Status
McCarty Farm Site	40UN4		1934	
Hill Farm Site	40UN6		1934	
Wilson Farm Site	40UN7		1934	
Walters Farm Site	40UN11		1934	
Stiner Farm Site	40UN18		1934	
George Snoderly Homestead Site	40UN33	Historic	1934, 1983	
Houck Snoderly Homestead Site	40UN36	Historic	1934, 1983	
J.M. Turner Homestead Site	40UN37	Historic	1934, 1983	
Esther B. Nelson Homestead Site	40UN38	Historic	1934, 1983	

== Van Buren County ==
Site	Designation	Cultural affiliation(s)	Year(s) excavated	Status
Big Bone Cave	40VB103	Woodland, American		

== Warren County ==
Site	Designation	Cultural affiliation(s)	Year(s) excavated	Status
Cardwell Mountain	40WR15	Archaic, Woodland, Mississippian		
Myers Mound	40WR5	Archaic, Woodland, Mississippian		

== Washington County ==
Site	Designation	Cultural affiliation(s)	Year(s) excavated	Status
Plum Grove Archaeological Site (Jackson Farm Site)	40WG17	Woodland, Mississippian	1976- Current	Active

== Wayne County ==
Site	Designation	Cultural affiliation(s)	Year(s) excavated	Status
General Surface and Shovel Test	40WY73		1991	

== Weakley County ==
Site	Designation	Cultural affiliation(s)	Year(s) excavated	Status
Barner Site	40WK83	Woodland	1991	

== White County ==
Site	Designation	Cultural affiliation(s)	Year(s) excavated	Status
Cherry Creek Mound	40WH65	Archaic, Woodland, Mississippian		
Indian Cave	40WH43	Woodland, Mississippian		
Officer Cave	40WH98		1980s	

== Williamson County ==
Site	Designation	Cultural affiliation(s)	Year(s) excavated	Status
Fewkes Group Archaeological Site	40WM1	Mississippian	1920, 1998	NRHP
Old Town Archaeological Site	40WM2	Mississippian	1920, 1998	NRHP
Anderson Site	40WM9	Archaic	1980–1981	
Kellytown Site	40WM10	Mississippian		
Coats-Hines Site	40WM31	Paleo-Indian	1995	
Carnton Site	40WM32	American plantation		National historic landmark
Harpeth Furnace Site	40WM83	American industry		
Roper's Knob Fortifications Site	40WM101	American military		
Triune Fortification Site	40WM106	American military		
Brentwood Library Site	40WM210	Mississippian		

== Wilson County ==
Site	Designation	Cultural affiliation(s)	Year(s) excavated	Status
Sellars Indian Mound	40WI1	Mississippian		Managed by Long Hunter State Park

== Location not publicized ==
Site	Designation	Cultural affiliation(s)	Year(s) excavated	Status
Mud Glyph Cave		Mississippian	1980s	

== See also ==
Tennessee Division of Archaeology

History of Tennessee

== Resources ==
- Frank H. McClung Museum
- The Tennessee Encyclopedia of History and Culture
- Tennessee Archaeology: A Synthesis
- Tennessee Archaeology Network
- Southeastern Archaeological Center Outline of Prehistory and History
- Archaeological Investigations in the Tims Ford Reservoir, Tennessee, 1966
