= Chickamauga and Chattanooga National Military Park =

Preserved battlefields of the American Civil War in Georgia and Tennessee, United States

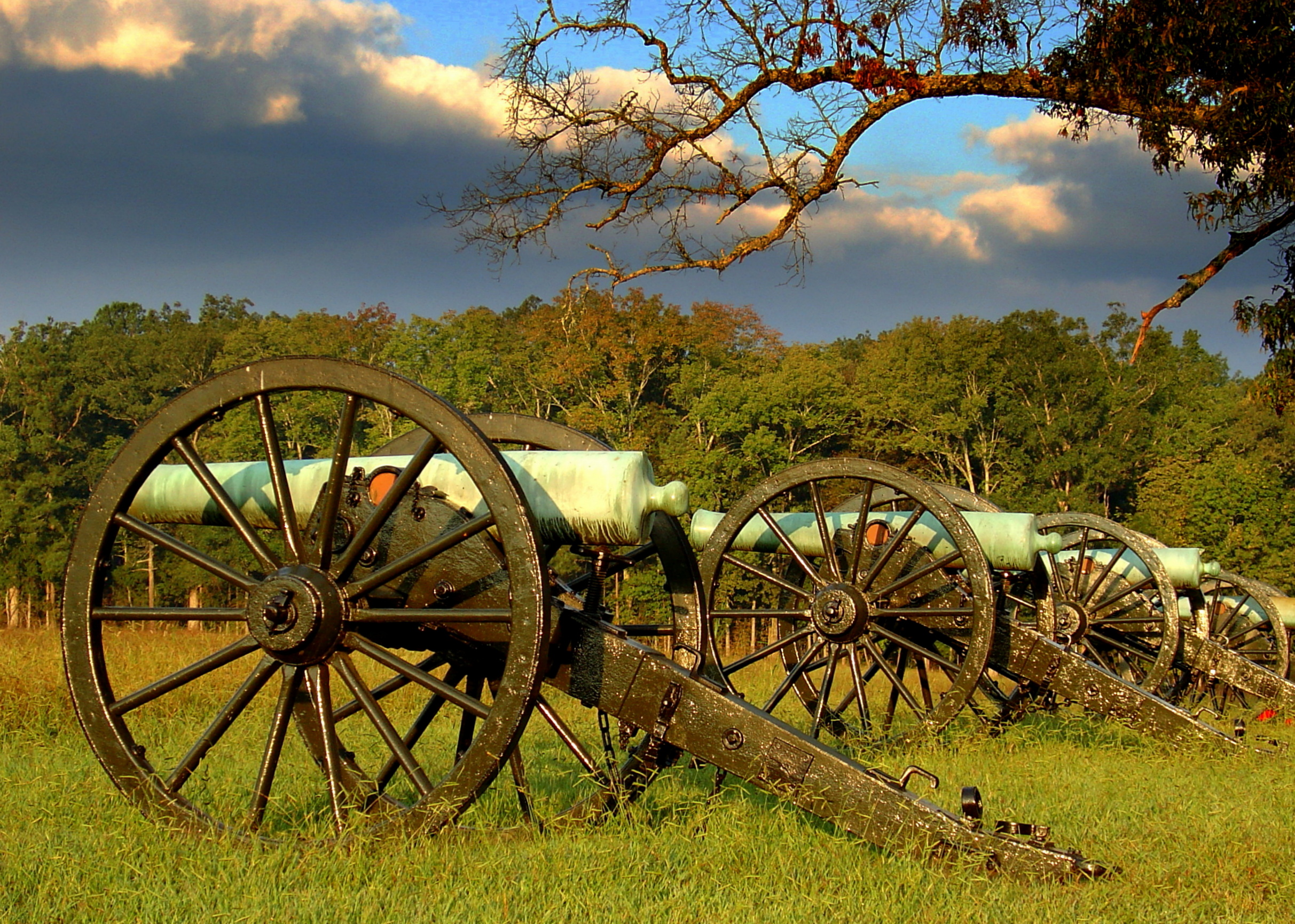
- Cannon Row

- Location within Tennessee Location within the United States
- Location: Catoosa, Dade, & Walker County, Georgia & Hamilton County, Tennessee, United States
- Nearest city: Chattanooga, Tennessee
- Coordinates: 34°56′24″N 85°15′36″W
- Area: 9,523 acres (38.54 km^{2})
- Established: August 19, 1890
- Visitors: 1,021,822 (in 2023)
- Governing body: National Park Service
- Website: Chickamauga and Chattanooga National Military Park
- Chickamauga and Chattanooga National Military Park
- U.S. National Register of Historic Places
- U.S. National Historic Landmark
- Location: S of Chattanooga on U.S. 27, Fort Oglethorpe, Georgia
- Built: 1890
- Built by: United States War Department, National Park Service
- Architectural style: Bungalow/Craftsman, Single-pen log cabin
- NRHP reference No.: 66000274
- Added to NRHP: October 15, 1966

Chickamauga and Chattanooga National Military Park, located in northwestern Georgia and southeastern Tennessee, preserves the sites of two major battles of the American Civil War: the Battle of Chickamauga and the Siege of Chattanooga. A detailed history of the park's development was provided by the National Park Service in 1998.

== History ==
Starting in 1890, during the decade, the Congress of the United States authorized the establishment of the first four national military parks: Chickamauga and Chattanooga, Shiloh, Gettysburg and Vicksburg.

The first and largest of these (5,300 acres or 2,145 ha), and the one upon which the establishment and development of most other national military and historical parks was based, was authorized in 1890 at Chickamauga, Georgia, and Chattanooga, Tennessee. It was officially dedicated in September 1895. It owes its existence chiefly to the efforts of Generals Henry V. Boynton and Ferdinand Van Derveer, both veterans of the Union Army of the Cumberland, who saw the need for a federal park to preserve and commemorate these battlefields. Another early proponent and driving force behind the park's creation was Ohio General Henry M. Cist, who led the Chickamauga Memorial Society in 1888. Franklin Guest Smith, a former Union officer still on active duty, served as secretary and member of the board of commissioners from 1893 until his 1903 military retirement, and served in the same role as a civilian until 1908. Another former Union officer, Charles H. Grosvenor, was chairman of the park commission from 1910 until his death in 1917. During the Park's early years, it was managed by the War Department and used for military study as well as a memorial. The National Park Service took over site management in 1933.

== Use during the Spanish–American War ==
The newly created Chickamauga and Chattanooga National Military Park was used during the Spanish–American War as a major training center for troops in the southern states. The park was temporarily renamed "Camp George H. Thomas" in honor of the union army commander during the Civil War battle at the site. The park's proximity to the major rail hub at Chattanooga and its large tracts of land made it a logical marshalling area for troops being readied for service in Cuba and other points south.

== Park areas ==
The military park consists of four main areas, and a few small isolated reservations, around Chattanooga.

- Chickamauga Battlefield
- Missionary Ridge
- Lookout Mountain Battlefield and Point Park
- Moccasin Bend

On October 15, 1966, as with all historic areas already administered by the National Park Service, the military park was listed on the National Register of Historic Places.

On February 20, 2003, Public Law No: 108-7 added Moccasin Bend as a new unit of the park. Moccasin Bend Archaeological District, designated a National Historic Landmark on September 8, 1986, is directly across the Tennessee River from Lookout Mountain. It is significant due to its archaeological resources of American Indian settlement. There are currently minimal visitor services at Moccasin Bend, including two hiking trails (the Blue Blazes Trail and the Browns Ferry Road) and a ten-acre meadow. Each of these areas is open to the public. The park anticipates further development, land restoration, and visitor services in the years to come.

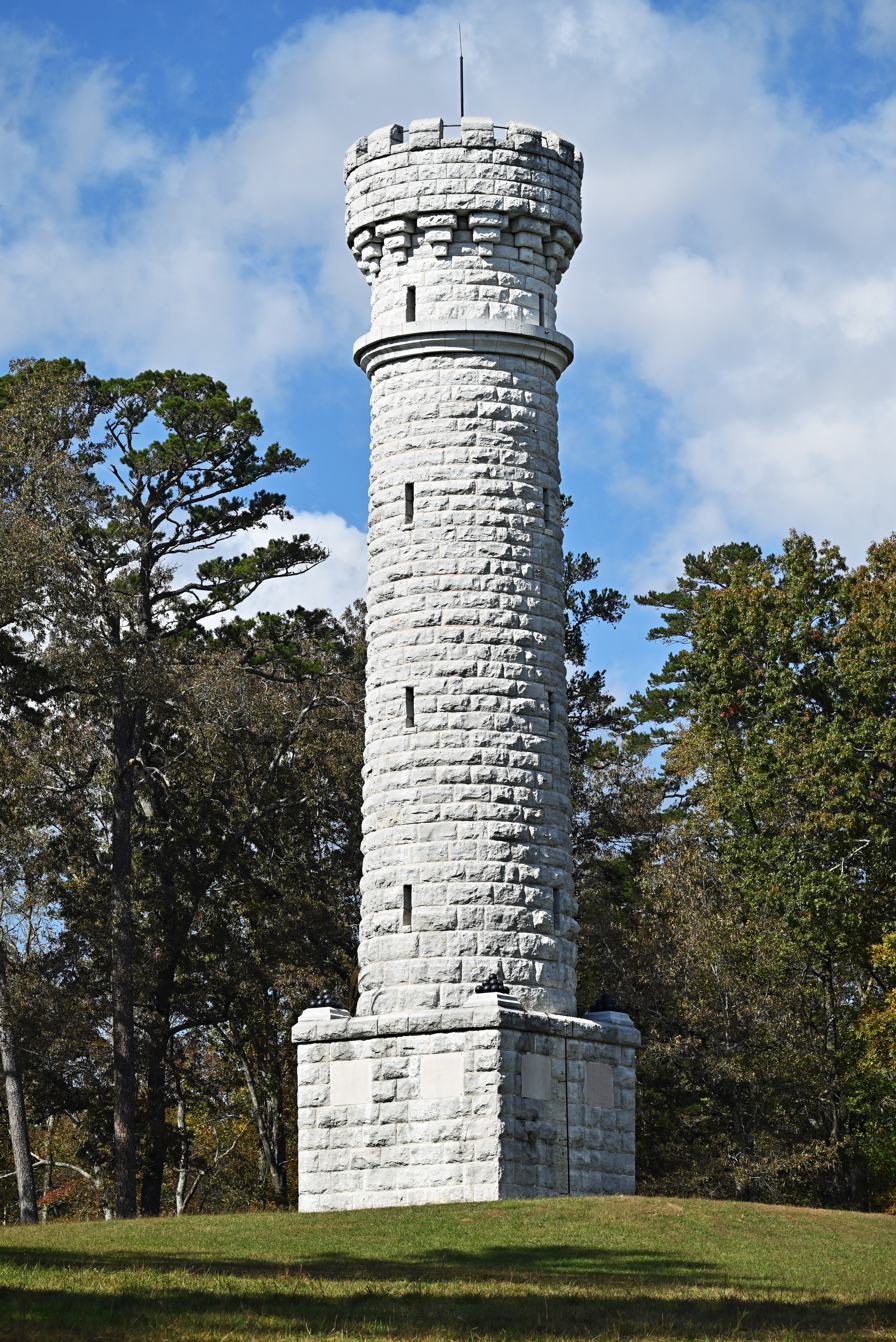
Wilder Brigade Monument at the Chickamauga Battlefield unit

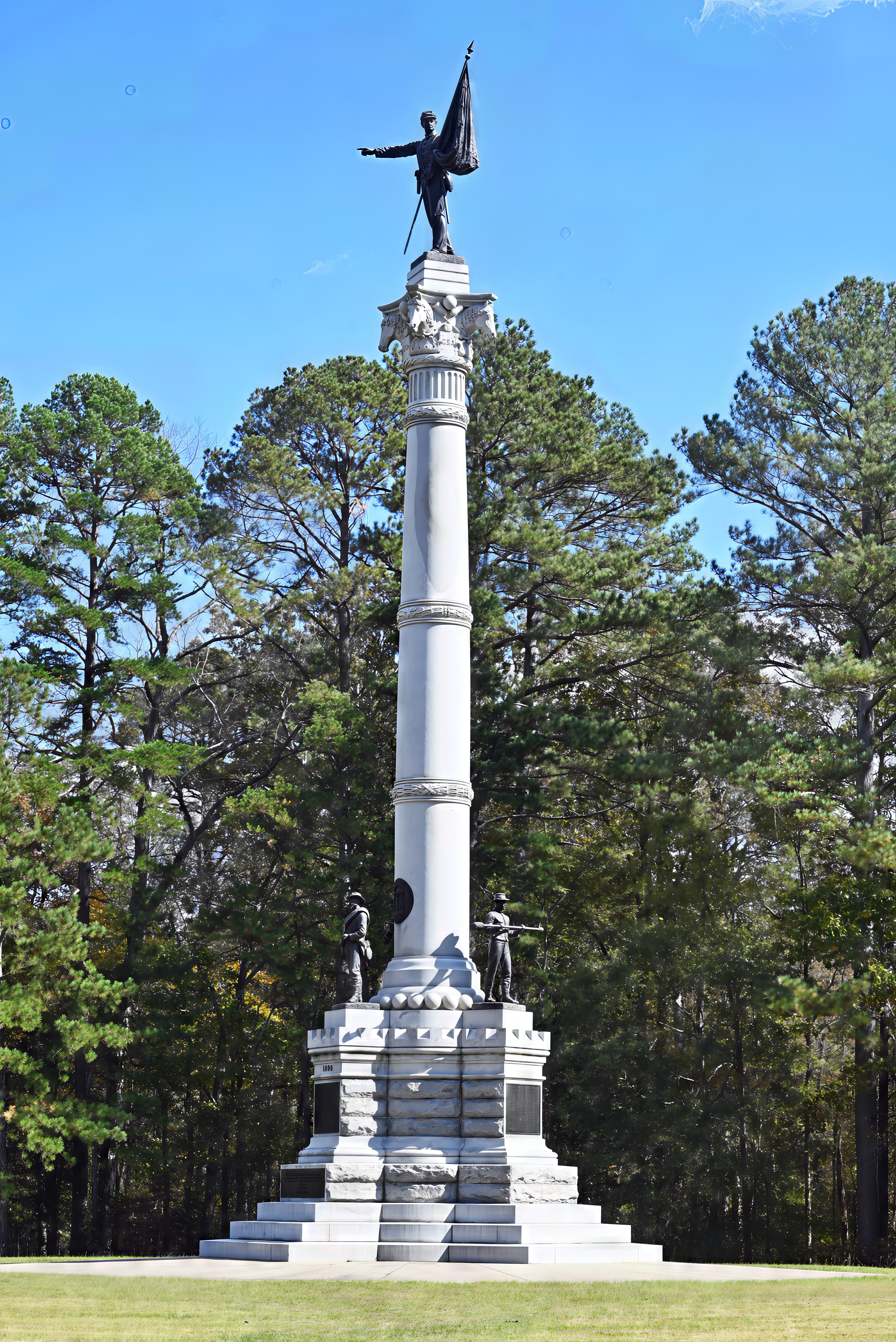
Georgia Monument

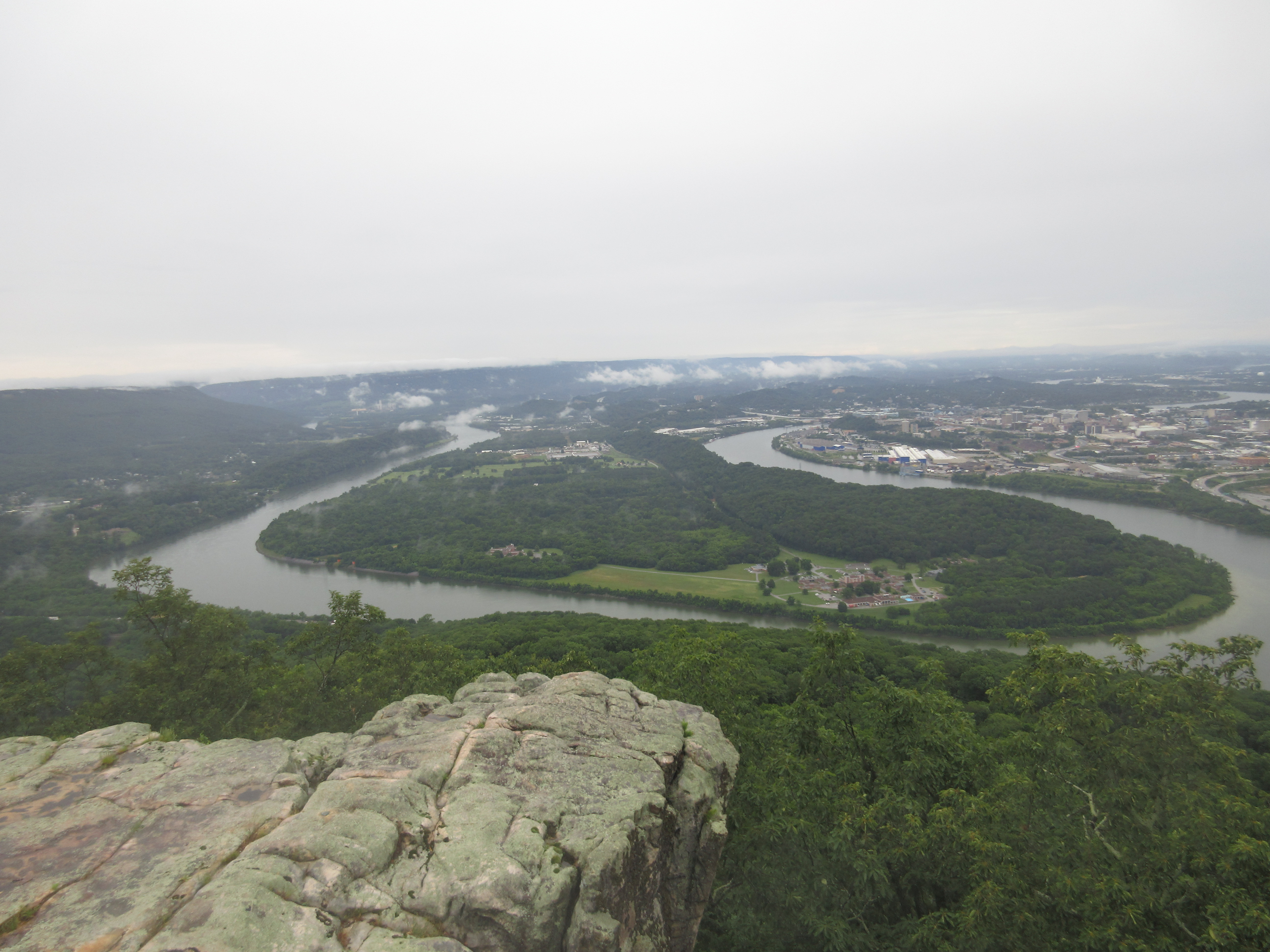
Chattanooga and Moccasin Bend viewed from the Lookout Mountain unit

== See also ==
- First Battle of Chattanooga
- Second Battle of Chattanooga
