= Ruel Milton Johnson =

American Medal of Honor recipient (1836–1901)

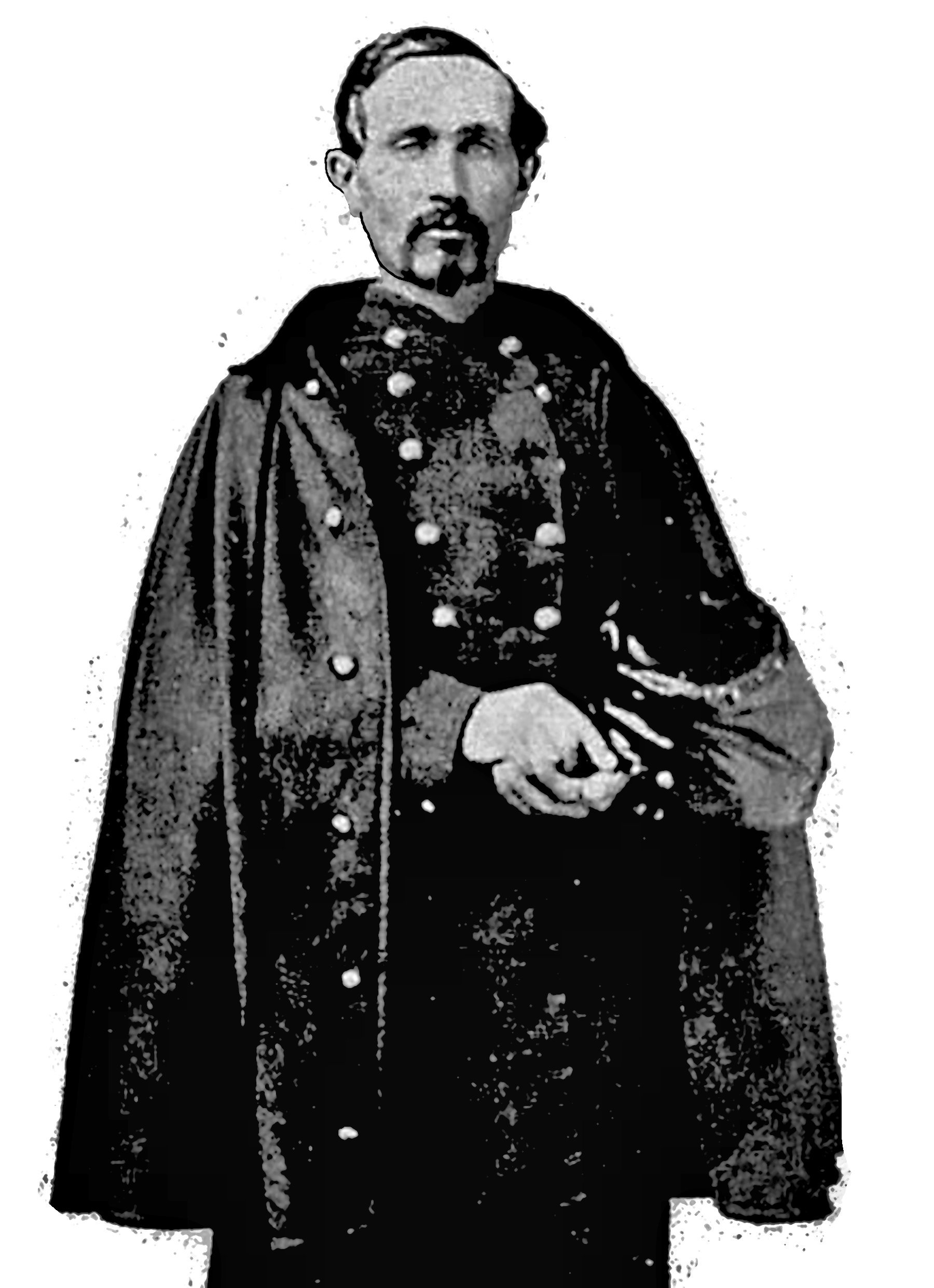
- Born: June 5, 1836; Harborcreek Township, Pennsylvania, US
- Died: November 12, 1901 (aged 65); Goshen, Indiana, US
- Burial place: Oakridge Cemetery, Goshen, Indiana
- Military career
- Allegiance: United States
- Branch: US Army; Union Army
- Rank: Major
- Unit: 100th Regiment, Indiana Volunteer Infantry
- Conflicts: Battle of Missionary Ridge
- Awards: Medal of Honor

Ruel Milton Johnson (June 5, 1836 – November 12, 1901) was an American soldier who fought in the American Civil War. Johnson received the Medal of Honor, his country's highest award for bravery in combat, for his extraordinary heroism at the Battle of Missionary Ridge on November 25, 1863, while a major in temporary command of the 100th Regiment, Indiana Volunteer Infantry. He was honored with the award on August 24, 1896. Johnson was later promoted to lieutenant colonel, and commanded the 100th Indiana from May 2, 1865, until it was mustered out on June 8, 1865. After the Civil War, Johnson worked as a lawyer, and died in 1901 in Goshen, Indiana.

Johnson was born in Harborcreek Township in Erie County, Pennsylvania, and graduated from the University of Michigan in 1858.

== Medal of Honor citation ==
The President of the United States of America, in the name of Congress, takes pleasure in presenting the Medal of Honor to Major Ruel M. Johnson, United States Army, for extraordinary heroism on 25 November 1863, while serving with 100th Indiana Infantry, in action at Chattanooga, Tennessee. While in command of the regiment Major Johnson bravely exposed himself to the fire of the enemy, encouraging and cheering his men.

== See also ==
- List of American Civil War Medal of Honor recipients: G–L
