= Savannah Archaeological Site =

Archaeological site in Hardin County, Tennessee, U.S.

- Location within Tennessee today Savannah Archaeological Site (the United States)
- 35°13′30.42″N 88°15′21.04″W
- Cultures: South Appalachian Mississippian culture
- Location: Hardin County, Tennessee, USA
- Region: Hardin County, Tennessee

Site notes
- Architectural styles: platform mounds, plaza

The Savannah Archaeological Site in Hardin County, Tennessee, is a prehistoric complex of platform mounds and village of the South Appalachian Mississippian culture, a regional variation of Mississippian culture.

== Site description ==
The Mississippian culture village and mound complex is located on the eastern bank of the Tennessee River and is covered by the modern city of Savannah, Tennessee. The 16 mounds form a zig-zag line of nearly a mile along the Tennessee River. The largest of the platform mounds is located at the center of the site, and was 30 feet (9.1 m) in height. A trench circling along the east side of this line connects with the river, at the north end and at the south end, thus the river to the west and the trench to the east, entirely encircled this ancient village. These have never been extensively excavated.

In 1830, David Robinson, a wealthy landowner and local planter, built a Federal-style home overlooking the Tennessee River on one of the mounds. The house is now known as the Cherry Mansion.

== See also ==
- Shiloh Indian Mounds Site
- Swallow Bluff Island Mounds
- List of Mississippian sites
