= 35th Ohio Infantry Regiment =

- Active: September 20, 1861, to September 28, 1864
- Country: United States
- Allegiance: Union
- Branch: Union Army
- Type: Infantry
- Engagements: Battle of Mill Springs; Siege of Corinth; Battle of Perryville; Battle of Stones River; Tullahoma Campaign; Battle of Chickamauga; Siege of Chattanooga; Battle of Missionary Ridge; Atlanta campaign; Battle of Resaca; Battle of Kennesaw Mountain; Siege of Atlanta

The 35th Ohio Infantry Regiment was an infantry regiment in the Union Army during the American Civil War. It was nicknamed the "Persimmon Regiment."

== Service ==
The 35th Ohio Infantry Regiment was organized in Hamilton, Ohio and mustered in for three years service on September 20, 1861, under the command of Colonel Ferdinand Van Derveer.

The regiment was attached to 3rd Brigade, Army of the Ohio, November–December 1861. 3rd Brigade, 1st Division, Army of the Ohio, to September 1862. 3rd Brigade, 1st Division, III Corps, Army of the Ohio, to November 1862. 3rd Brigade, 3rd Division, Center, XIV Corps, Army of the Cumberland, to January 1863. 3rd Brigade, 3rd Division, XIV Corps, Army of the Cumberland, to October 1863. 2nd Brigade, 3rd Division, XIV Corps, to August 1864.

The 35th Ohio Infantry mustered out of service at Chattanooga, Tennessee August 26-September 28, 1864. Veterans and recruits were transferred to the 18th Ohio Infantry.

=== Detailed service ===
==== 1861 ====
Moved to Covington, Ky., September 26. Was assigned to guard duty along the Kentucky Central Railroad. Headquarters at Cynthiana, until November. At Paris, Ky., until December. Operations about Mill Springs and Somerset, Ky., December 1–13, 1861. Action at Fishing Creek, near Somerset, December 8.

==== 1862 ====
Advance to Camp Hamilton January 1–17, 1862. Battle of Mill Springs January 19–20. March to Louisville, Ky., thence moved to Nashville, Tenn., via Ohio and Cumberland Rivers February 10-March 2. March to Savannah, Tenn., March 20-April 8. Advance on and siege of Corinth, Miss., April 29-May 30. Pursuit to Booneville May 31-June 14. Moved to Tuscumbia, Ala., June 22, and duty there until July 27. Moved to Dechard, Tenn., July 27. March to Louisville. Ky., in pursuit of Bragg August 21-September 26. Pursuit of Bragg into Kentucky October 1–15. Battle of Perryville, Ky., October 8 (reserve). March to Nashville, Tenn., October 16-November 7. Duty at South Tunnel, opening railroad communications with Nashville, November 8–26. Guarding fords of the Cumberland until January 14, 1863.

==== 1863 ====
Duty at Nashville, Tenn., January 15-March 6. Moved to Triune March 6, and duty there until June. Expedition toward Columbia March 6–14. Franklin June 4–5. Tullahoma Campaign June 23-July 7. Hoover's Gap June 24–26. Occupation of middle Tennessee until August 16. Passage of the Cumberland Mountains and Tennessee River, and Chickamauga Campaign August 16-September 22. Battle of Chickamauga September 19–21. Siege of Chattanooga, Tenn., September 24-November 23.

==== 1864 ====
Demonstration on Dalton, Ga., February 22–27, 1864. Tunnel Hill, Buzzard's Roost Gap and Rocky Faced Ridge February 23–25. Reconnaissance from Ringgold toward Tunnel Hill April 29. Atlanta Campaign May 1-August 3. Demonstration on Rocky Faced Ridge May 8–11. Battle of Resaca May 14–15. Advance on Dallas May 18–25. Operations on Pumpkin Vine Creek and battles about Dallas, New Hope Church and Allatoona Hills May 25-June 5. Operations about Marietta and against Kennesaw Mountain June 10-July 2. Pine Hill June 11–14. Lost Mountain June 15–17. Assault on Kennesaw June 27. Ruff's Station July 4. Chattahoochie River July 5–17. Peachtree Creek July 19–20. Siege of Atlanta July 22-August 3. Ordered to Chattanooga, Tenn., August 3.

== Casualties ==
The regiment lost a total of 208 men during service; 5 officers and 75 enlisted men killed or mortally wounded, 2 officers and 126 enlisted men died of disease.

== Commanders ==
- Colonel Ferdinand Van Derveer
- Colonel Henry Van Ness Boynton - commanded at the battle of Chickamauga as lieutenant colonel

== Notable members ==
- Colonel Henry Van Ness Boynton - Medal of Honor recipient for action at the battle of Missionary Ridge

== See also ==
- List of Ohio Civil War units
- Ohio in the Civil War
