= Charles W. Brouse =

American Civil War soldier

- Born: December 30, 1839; Indianapolis, Indiana, US
- Died: October 26, 1904 (aged 64); Indianapolis, Indiana, US
- Burial place: [[Crown Hill Cemetery]] and Arboretum, Indianapolis, Indiana U.S.
- Military career
- Allegiance: United States of America
- Branch: US Army; Union Army
- Service years: 1862–1865
- Rank: Captain
- Unit: 100th Regiment, Indiana Volunteer Infantry
- Conflicts: Battle of Missionary Ridge
- Awards: Medal of Honor

Charles W. Brouse (December 30, 1839 – October 26, 1904) was an American soldier who received the Medal of Honor for valor during the American Civil War.

== Biography ==
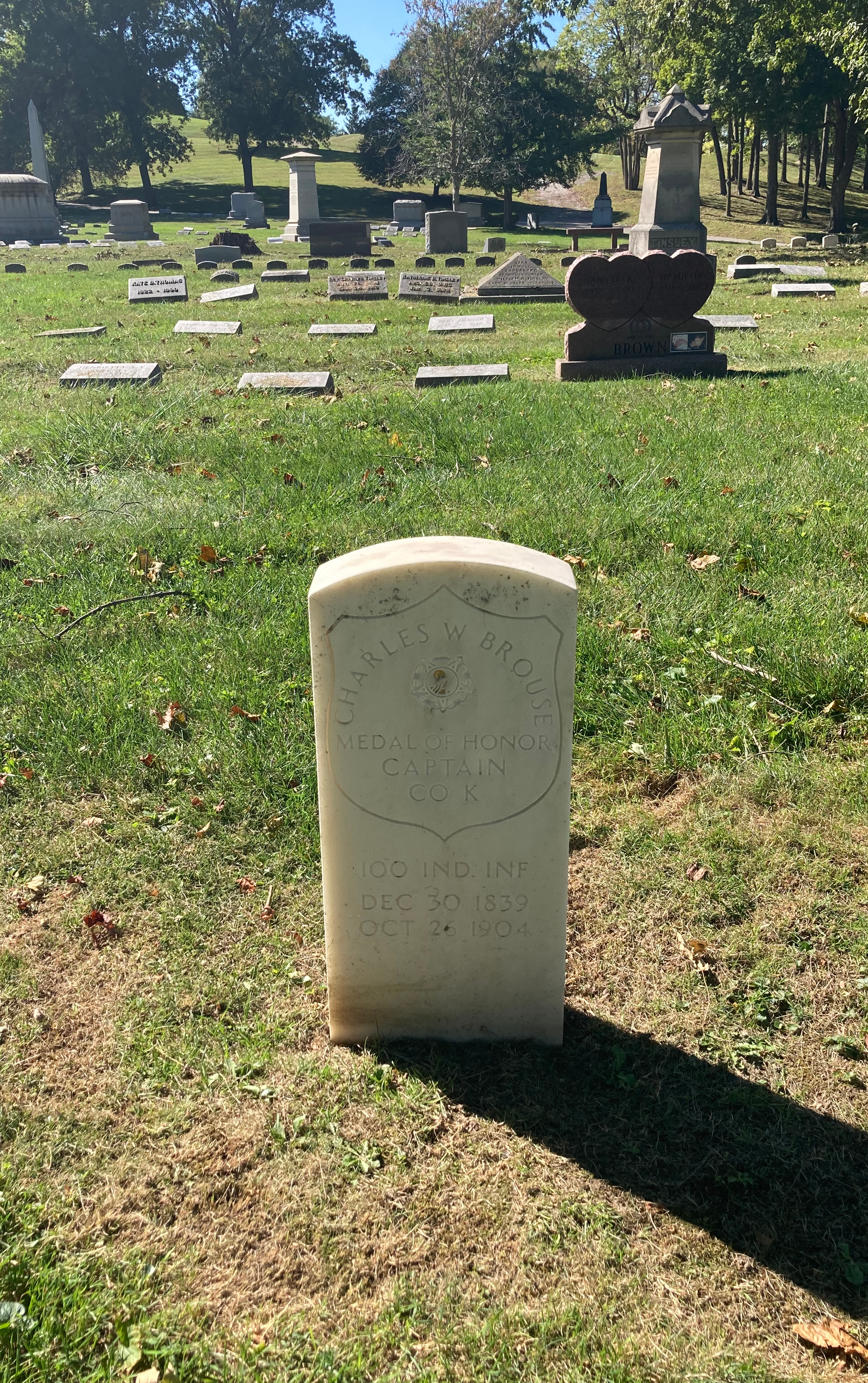
Brouse's grave at Crown Hill Cemetery

Brouse was commissioned as a Captain of Company K, 100th Regiment, Indiana Volunteer Infantry on September 24, 1862, and was discharged due to disability on January 16, 1865. He received the Medal of Honor on May 16, 1899, for his actions at the Battle of Missionary Ridge, Tennessee, on November 25, 1863.

He died from heart disease at his home in Indianapolis on October 26, 1904, and was buried at Crown Hill Cemetery.

== Battle of Missionary Ridge ==
Brouse was on detached duty at the beginning of the battle but opted to take part anyway. His wounds during the battle were so severe that battlefield surgeons assumed he was a lost cause and did not address his wounds at first. After finding him still alive after 48 hours, they finally dressed his wounds.

== Medal of Honor citation ==
Citation:

To encourage his men whom he had ordered to lie down while under severe fire, and who were partially protected by slight earthworks, himself refused to lie down, but walked along the top of the works until he fell severely wounded.

== See also ==
- List of American Civil War Medal of Honor recipients: A-F
