= Persimmon regiment =

American Civil War regiment that stopped to eat persimmons

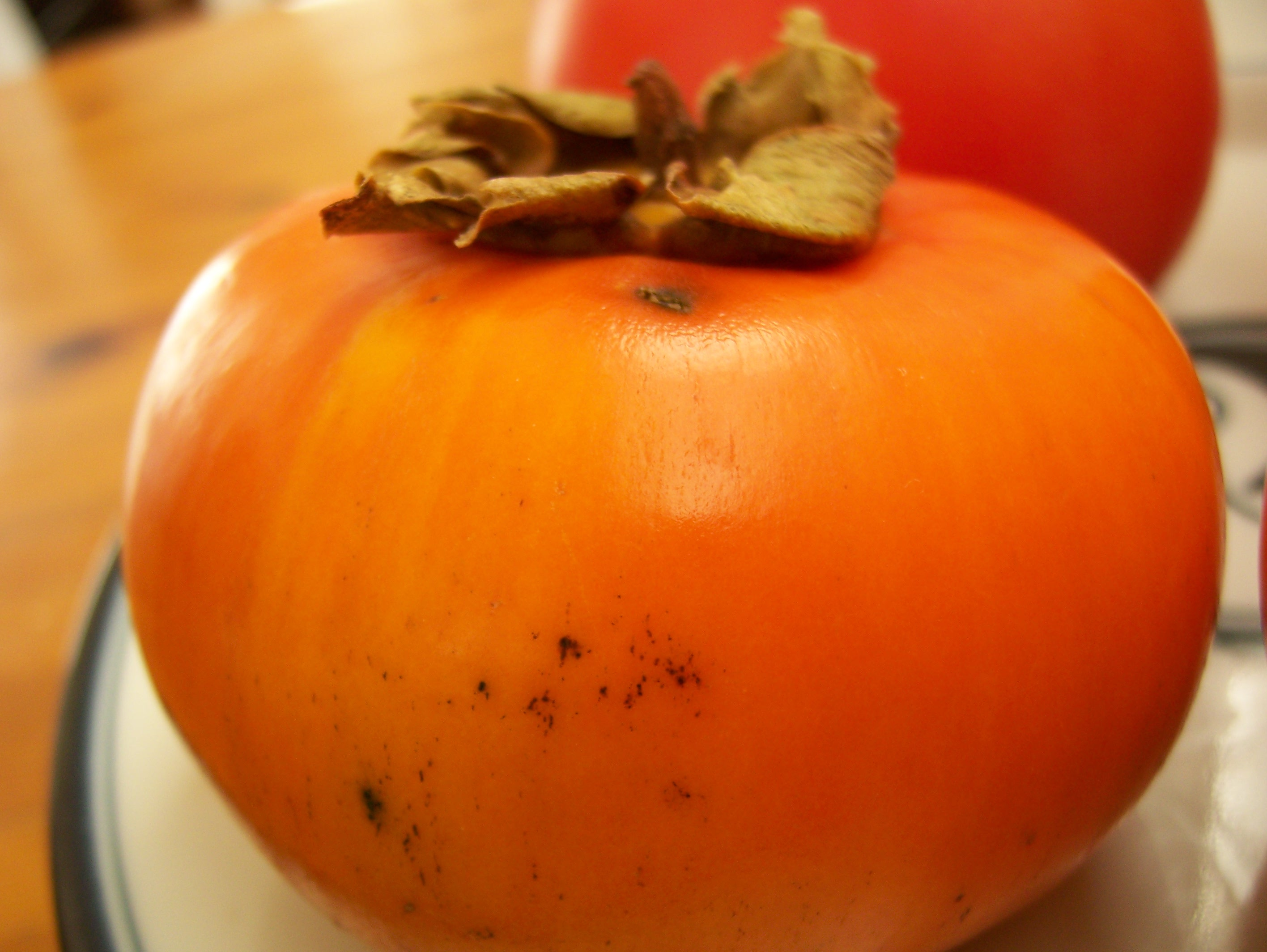
A persimmon

Persimmon regiment was a term used during the American Civil War to describe a regiment that, in its history, stopped marching for a brief while to consume persimmons, a type of fruit popular in the Southern United States. Three different regiments in the Union army acquired the nickname.

The 73rd Illinois Volunteer Infantry Regiment gained the nickname in 1862. While marching from Crab Orchard, Kentucky, as the regiment progressed to Nashville, Tennessee, many of the troops would make the first act after making camp for the night to search for a persimmon grove and raid it, even before making coffee or setting tents. This practice also occurred around the Battle of Mill Springs. Colonel Bernard Laiboldt, after seeing this practice occur far too often for his taste, said that with the 73rd Illinois taste for persimmons and the 2nd Missouri's love of rails that he could capture the Confederate capital of Richmond, Virginia solely with those two regiments, if a pile of persimmon trees and rails were to be found on Richmond's public square.

The 35th Ohio Infantry gained the nickname due to fifteen of their number being captured by the Confederate States Army in December 1861 in a skirmish where, instead of fighting the Confederacy, the Ohioans instead chose to find persimmons.

The 100th Indiana Regiment gained the nickname while participating in General Ulysses S. Grant's Vicksburg campaign. On the first day of marching from Memphis, Tennessee to Vicksburg, Mississippi, the regiment disregarded their role as rear guards and, upon finding an orchard of ripe persimmons, took a long time harvesting the fruit, and were arrested as stragglers. After the incident, Confederate forces successfully stopped Grant's forces from having their food resupplied, which caused the 100th Indiana to often have persimmons as their only food. At first the nickname was used "derisively", but after the 100th Indiana Regiment showed much battle courage, the nickname became a source of pride long after the war.

== Sources ==
- Carpenter, Jesse (1888). The War for the Union. Angola, Ind., R. H. Carpenter.
- Garrison, Webb (2001). The Encyclopedia of Civil War Usage. Castle Books. ISBN 0-7858-2346-8.
- Indiana (1911). Indiana at Vicksburg. Vicksburg National Military Park Commission.
- Newlin, William (1890). A History of the Seventy-Third Regiment of Illinois Infantry Volunteers.
