= Henry V. Boynton =

Union Army officer, Medal of Honor recipient (1835–1905)

Henry Van Ness Boynton
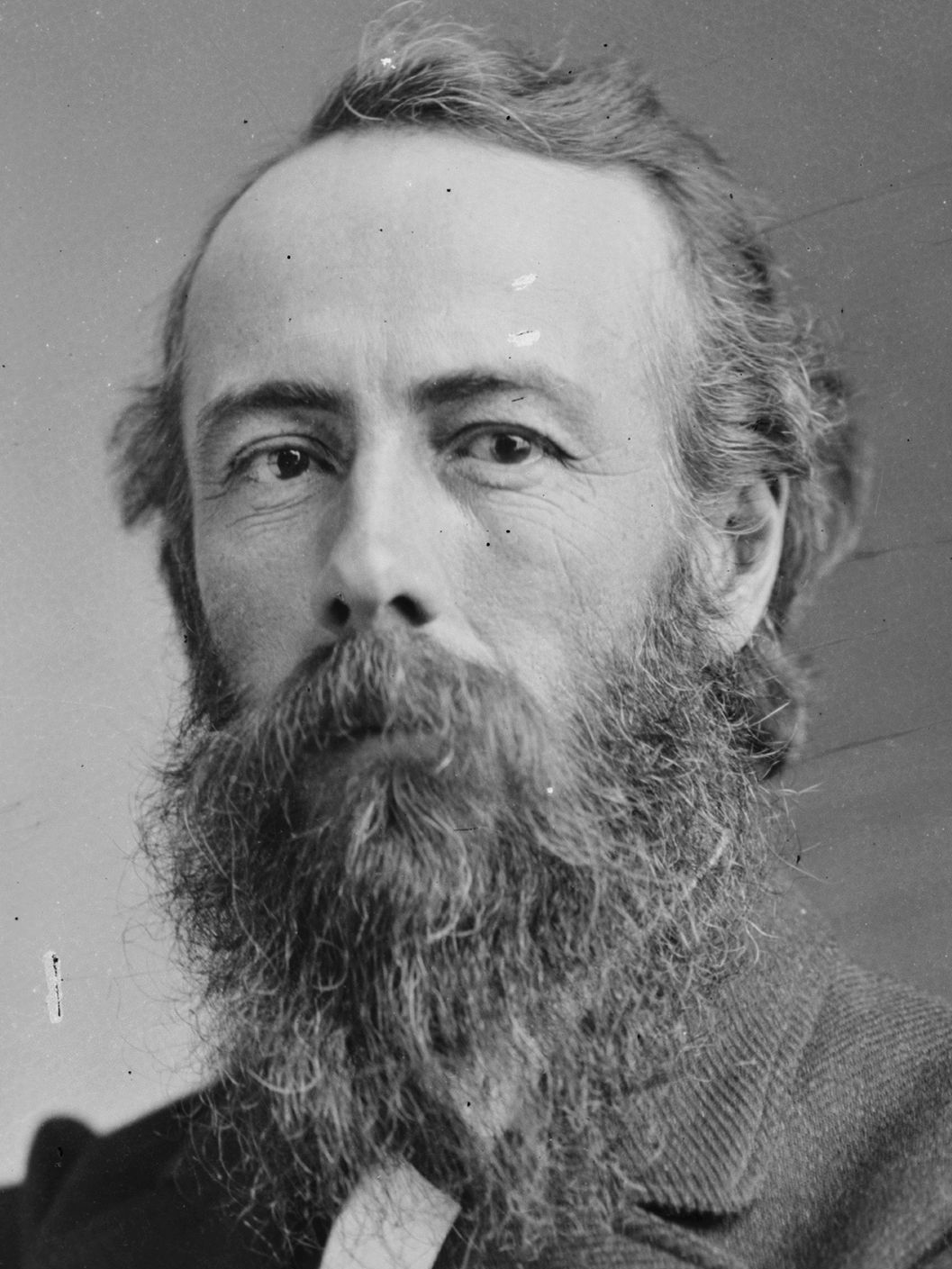
- Boynton in the 1870s
- Born: June 22, 1835; West Stockbridge, Massachusetts, US
- Died: June 3, 1905 (aged 69); Atlantic City, New Jersey, US
- Burial place: Arlington National Cemetery
- Military career
- Allegiance: United States; Union
- Branch: United States Army; Union Army
- Service years: 1861–1864, 1898–1899
- Rank: Brigadier General
- Unit: 35th Regiment Ohio Volunteer Infantry
- Commands: 35th Regiment Ohio Volunteer Infantry
- Conflicts: American Civil War; *Battle of Chickamauga; *Battle of Missionary Ridge Spanish–American War
- Awards: Medal of Honor

Henry Van Ness Boynton (June 22, 1835 – June 3, 1905) was a Union Army officer during the American Civil War and a recipient of America's highest military decoration, the Medal of Honor, for his actions at the Battle of Missionary Ridge. Returning to duty in 1898 during the Spanish–American War, Boynton was promoted to brigadier general.

== Early life ==
Boynton was born in West Stockbridge, Massachusetts, but was raised in Ohio where he graduated in 1854 from Woodward College, in Cincinnati, and subsequently from the Kentucky Military Institute in 1859. While there, he joined the Phi Delta Theta fraternity.

== Civil War ==
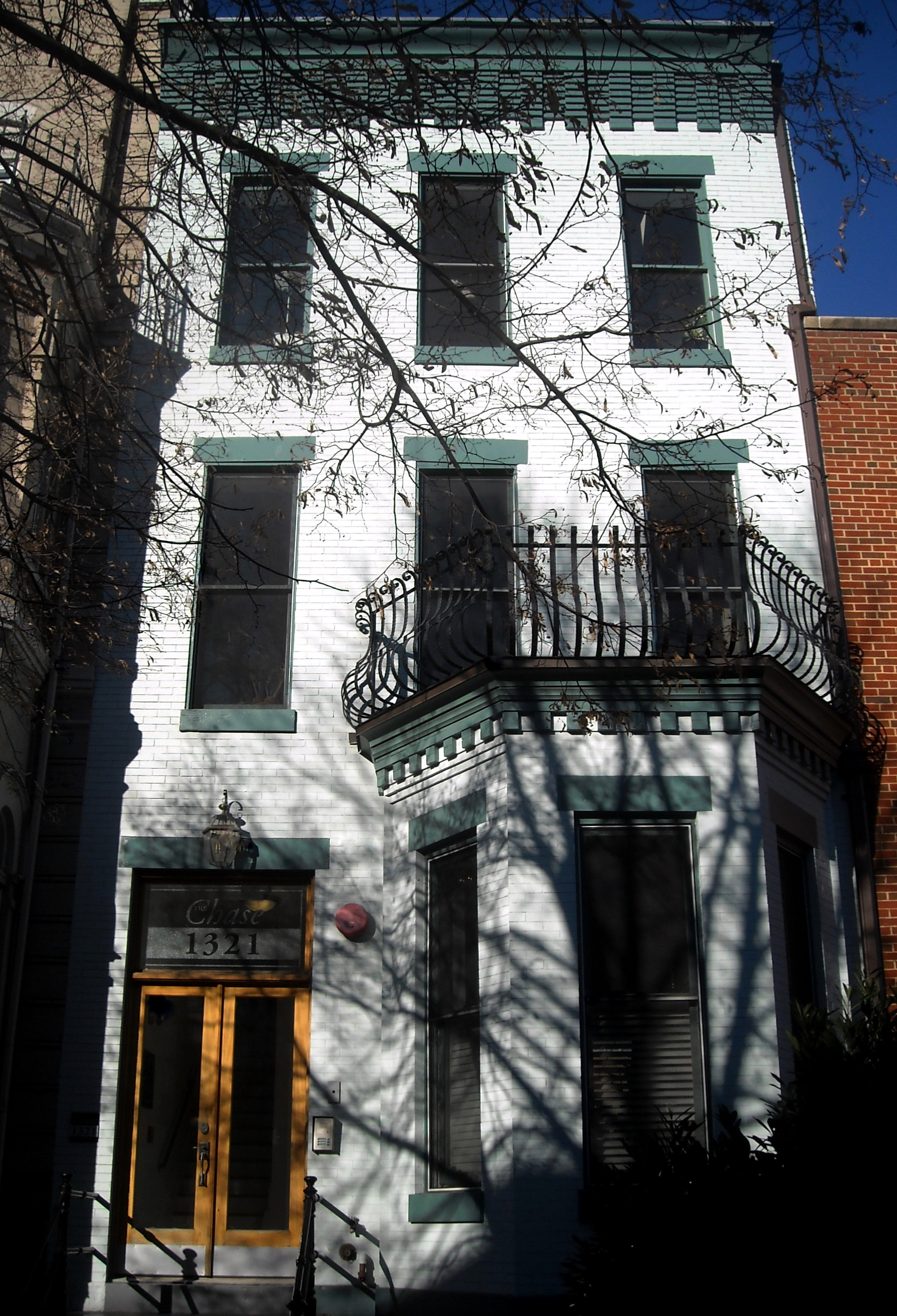
Boynton's former residence, located in the Logan Circle neighborhood of Washington, D.C.

From July 1861 until September 1864, Boynton served as a commissioned officer in the 35th Ohio Infantry. He was elected as the regiment's first major, but quickly rose up the ranks to become the commanding officer of the regiment and was promoted to lieutenant colonel. He led the 35th in the Battle of Chickamauga and Missionary Ridge, where he earned the Medal of Honor for his actions on November 25, 1863.

== After the war ==
After the war he resumed civilian life. He married Helen Augusta Mason in 1871 and became a newspaper correspondent in Washington, D.C. Boynton also became the chairman of the committee that oversaw the development of the Chickamauga and Chattanooga National Military Park. In June 1898, he returned to active military service as a brigadier general during the Spanish–American War. He was discharged in April 1899.

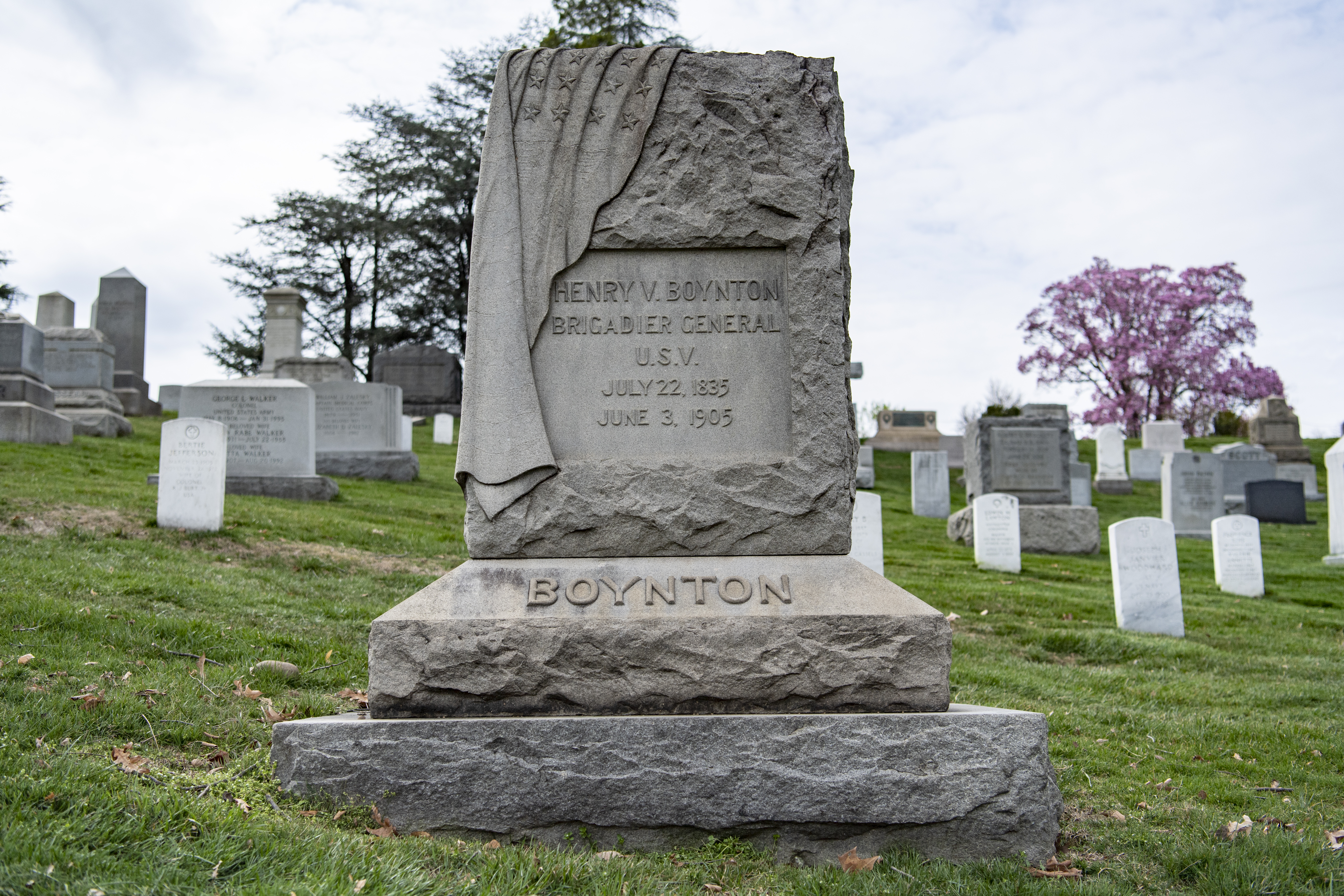
Boynton's gravestone in Arlington National Cemetery

Boynton died in 1905 in Atlantic City, New Jersey. His funeral service on June 3, was attended by President Theodore Roosevelt and a delegation representing his old comrades in the Army of the Cumberland. He was buried on June 7, 1905, at Arlington National Cemetery, Arlington, Arlington County, Virginia.

== Medal of Honor citation ==

Rank and Organization:

Lieutenant Colonel, 35th Ohio Infantry.

Place and date: At Missionary Ridge, Tenn., November 25, 1863. Entered service at: Ohio. Born: July 22, 1835, West Stockbridge, Mass. Date of issue: November 15, 1893.

Citation:

Led his regiment in the face of a severe fire of the enemy; was severely wounded.

== See also ==
- List of Medal of Honor recipients
- List of American Civil War Medal of Honor recipients: A–F
