= 100th Indiana Infantry Regiment =

100th Regiment Indiana Volunteer Infantry
- Active: September 10, 1862 - June 8, 1865
- Country: United States
- Allegiance: Union
- Branch: Infantry
- Size: Regiment
- Engagements: American Civil War: Vicksburg Campaign; Battle of Missionary Ridge; Atlanta Campaign; Sherman's March to the Sea; Battle of Bentonville

The 100th Regiment, Indiana Volunteer Infantry, was an infantry regiment that served in the Union Army during the American Civil War. It was one of three Union regiments referred to as the Persimmon regiment. Organized at Fort Wayne, Indiana, and mustered on September 10, 1862, the 100th participated in major campaigns and in 25 battles. The regiment was in the Grand Review of the Armies in Washington, D.C., on May 23–24, 1865, and mustered out on June 8, 1865. It lost during its service 58 officers and enlisted men killed in action or mortally wounded, and 176 by disease for a total of 234 fatalities.

Two officers of the 100th Indiana were awarded the Medal of Honor for extraordinary heroism at the Battle of Missionary Ridge, Tennessee, on November 25, 1863: Captain Charles W. Brouse of Company K, and Major Ruel M. Johnson, then in temporary command of the regiment.

== Colonels ==
- Colonel Sanford J. Stoughton - resigned January 7, 1864.
- Lieutenant Colonel Albert Heath - discharged for disability May 10, 1865.
- Lieutenant Colonel Ruel M. Johnson - mustered out with regiment on June 8, 1865.

== See also ==
- List of Indiana Civil War regiments

== Bibliography ==
- Transcription of letter showing Colonel Stoughton
- Another Transcription of letter showing Colonel Stoughton
