= Cherry Mansion =

Historic house in Tennessee, United States

- U.S. National Register of Historic Places
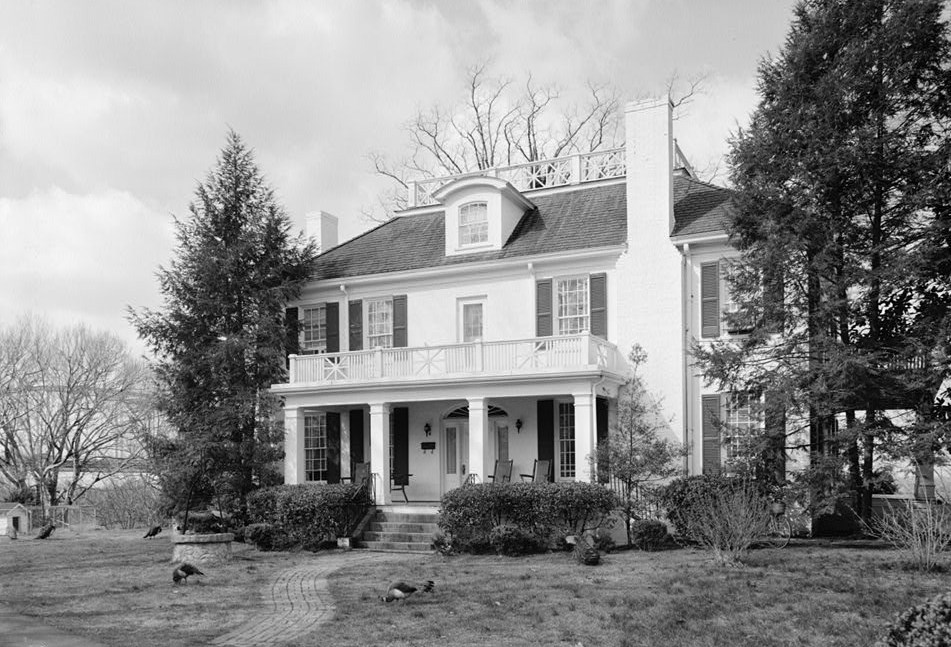
- Eastern facade of Cherry Mansion in 1974

- Location within Tennessee Location within the United States
- Location: 265 Main St., Savannah, Tennessee, US
- Coordinates: 35°13′32″N 88°15′24″W
- Area: 7 acres (2.8 ha)
- Built: 1829
- Built by: David Robinson
- Architectural style: Georgian
- NRHP reference No.: 77001274
- Added to NRHP: August 16, 1977

Cherry Mansion is a historic antebellum house in Savannah, Tennessee, located on a bluff overlooking the east bank of the Tennessee River. It has historical significance for its role as General Ulysses S. Grant's headquarters at the time of the Civil War Battle of Shiloh.

== Description and history ==
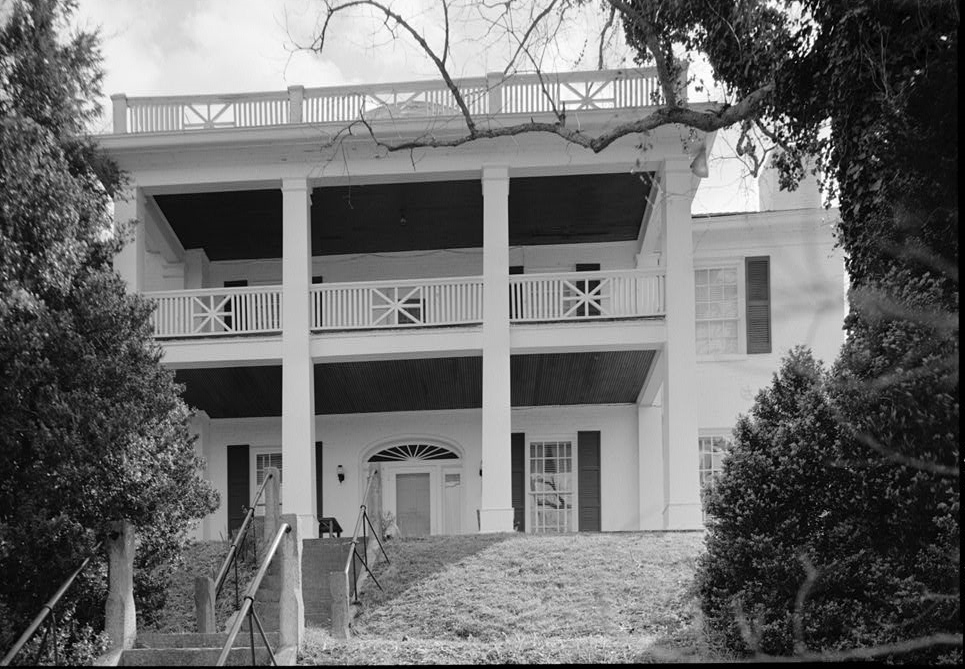
Western facade of Cherry Mansion, in 1974

Cherry Mansion is a white Georgian building with a two-level porch on its west front, which faces the Tennessee River. A series of terraces descends from the house to the river. The house sits atop the site of a palisaded prehistoric settlement, established some 2000 years ago, that is marked by Indian mounds that were largely obliterated by later construction.

The house was built by David Robinson, who was among Hardin County's early settlers and owned extensive acreage on both sides of the Tennessee River. Sources differ on the date of the house's construction. Most accounts state that it was built around 1829–30 as a wedding gift for Robinson's daughter Sarah and her husband, William H. Cherry. Analysis for the Historic American Buildings Survey found evidence that the house was not completed until around the time of Robinson's death in 1849, and that ownership was transferred to Cherry in 1855.

During the American Civil War, Cherry was sympathetic to the Union side. From March 13 to April 29, 1862, before and after the Battle of Shiloh, his house served as headquarters for Union Army Generals Ulysses S. Grant, C. F. Smith, Don Carlos Buell, and W. H. L. Wallace. According to Cherry family accounts, General Grant and his staff had just sat down at the breakfast table on April 6, 1862, when they heard distant cannon fire indicating that the battle had begun about 7 miles (11 km) up the river. They boarded a steamboat at the landing below the house to travel to the site of the battle, leaving their meals uneaten. Generals Smith and Wallace died in the house in the aftermath of the battle.

The Cherry family continued to own the house until 1935. Queen and Alex Haley, the grandparents of writer Alex Haley, worked for the family at Cherry Mansion after the Civil War. Queen was a domestic worker in the house and her husband operated a ferry for the Cherry family. Haley's novel Queen: The Story of an American Family and related television miniseries were based on Queen Haley's life.

In the late 19th century, the Cherry family made alterations to the building, replacing some of the house's original porticoes with woodwork of Victorian design. The next owner, Bob Guinn, undertook in 1935–36 to restore the porticoes to their original design, based on recollections of living members of the Cherry family. The restoration of the porticoes was part of a more extensive restoration and remodeling project, based on design plans by Memphis architect Hubert T. McGee, that included addition of a new kitchen and bath facilities, replacing weatherboard on the east wall with brick, and adding emphasis to the house's west front.

The house remains in private ownership and was listed on the National Register of Historic Places in 1977. It is opened to visitors by advance arrangement.

== See also ==
- Savannah Archaeological Site
