= Swallow Bluff Island =

Coordinates: 35.389243°N 88.164479°W

Swallow Bluff Island is a river island on the Tennessee River in the U.S. state of Tennessee. The island is 69 acres (28 ha) in size. The island was named for the swallows which congregated there.

Swallow Bluff Island contains the ancient Swallow Bluff Island Mounds. The state of Tennessee sued a developer who in 1999 razed parts of the island for new home construction, damaging the mound in the process.
