= Fort Defiance (Tennessee) =

American Civil War fort

Coordinates: 36.5406°N 87.3725°W

Fort Defiance (formerly also known as Fort Sevier and Fort Bruce) was a fort built during the American Civil War at Clarksville, Tennessee, on the Cumberland River. It changed hands several times during the war, and is now preserved by the city administration.

== Construction and Union takeover ==
In November 1861, Confederate troops began to build a defensive fort that would control the river approach to Clarksville. They mounted three guns in the fort. On February 19, 1862, Union gunboats came up the river from Fort Donelson and reported the fort displayed a white flag and was deserted. The Union took over the fort and enlarged it so that it would control traffic on the Hopkinsville (Kentucky) Pike. Clarksville was left with a small garrison of Union troops. In April 1862, this small garrison was made up of the 71st Ohio Volunteers commanded by Col. Rodney Mason.

== 1862 combat ==
During July and August 1862, there was an increase in guerrilla activity around Clarksville. On August 18, 1862, Clarksville was recaptured by Confederate Cavalry. Col. Mason was cashiered for surrendering Clarksville so easily, although this penalty was later revoked. Union soldiers were sent from Fort Donelson to retake Clarksville in September 1862. Skirmishes were fought at New Providence on September 6, 1862 and at Riggins Hill on September 7, 1862. The town and fort were reoccupied by Federal troops who remained for the rest of the war. Col. Bruce was placed in command at Clarksville and Fort Defiance was renamed Fort Bruce.

== Present-day monument ==
The four-acre Fort Defiance park features earthen fort and walking trails. It is located at 120 A Street, Clarksville, Tennessee. The city of Clarksville dedicated a new $2 million Fort Defiance Interpretive Center in 2011 in time for the 150th anniversary of the start of the American Civil War in 2011. The Fort has been owned by the City of Clarksville since the mid-1980s, when it was donated to the city by retired Judge Sam Boaz who had owned and preserved the site for some time.

== See also ==
- List of international forts
- History of Tennessee
- List of archaeological sites in Tennessee
- Tennessee in the American Civil War
