= 73rd Illinois Infantry Regiment =

73rd Regiment Illinois Volunteer Infantry
- Illinois state flag
- Active: August 21, 1862, to June 10, 1865
- Country: United States
- Allegiance: Union
- Branch: Infantry
- Engagements: Battle of Perryville; Battle of Stone's River; Siege of Chattanooga; Battle of Kennesaw Mountain; Battle of Jonesboro; Battle of Franklin; Battle of Nashville

The 73rd Regiment Illinois Volunteer Infantry, known as the "Persimmon Regiment" or the "Preacher's Regiment" was an infantry regiment that served in the Union Army during the American Civil War.

== Service ==
73rd Regiment Illinois was organized at Camp Butler, Illinois and mustered into Federal service on August 21, 1862.

The regiment was discharged from service on June 10, 1865.

== Total strength and casualties ==
The regiment suffered 5 officers and 109 enlisted men who were killed in action or mortally wounded and 167 enlisted men who died of disease, for a total of 281 fatalities.

== Commanders ==
- Colonel James F. Jacquess – Mustered out with the regiment.

== See also ==
- List of Illinois Civil War Units
- Illinois in the American Civil War
