= Anderson Site (Franklin, Tennessee) =

- U.S. National Register of Historic Places
- Location: Address Restricted, Franklin, Tennessee
- Area: 8 acres (3.2 ha)
- NRHP reference No.: 90000913
- Added to NRHP: June 14, 1990

The Anderson Site is a property in Franklin, Tennessee, United States, that was listed on the National Register of Historic Places in 1990. The NRHP listing was for an area of 8 acres (3.2 ha) with just one contributing site, which is an archeological site. It is an Archaic period site.
