= Bell site, Wisconsin =

- Bell site (47 Wn-09)
- U.S. National Register of Historic Places
- Location within Wisconsin Location within the United States
- Location: south side of Big Lake Butte des Morts, Winnebago County, Wisconsin
- NRHP reference No.: 92000818
- Added to NRHP: 1992

The Bell site (also known as 47 Wn-09) is located on the south side of Big Lake Butte des Morts in Winnebago County, Wisconsin, about 52 miles southeast of Green Bay. The site is classified as an early (c. 1600–1750 AD) historic village of the Meskwaki (Fox) people.

== Discovery ==
The Bell site was first discovered in 1911 when gravel mining operations uncovered the burial of an Indian chief and his horse. In the 1950s the site came to the attention of professional archaeologists. Mixed historic and prehistoric materials were being found by collectors, and the pottery was unlike any previously found at archaeological sites in Wisconsin. It was hypothesized that this site could be a village of a Central Angonkian tribe (native to Michigan or Ontario) which had been displaced in the 1600s during the Iroquois wars. Further research in the Wisconsin Historical Collections revealed that early French explorers had recorded a village of the Meskwaki people at the location of the site.

== Geography ==
Bell Site is approximately a 44.5-acre area which is then surrounded by an 18.6-acre palisaded residential core on top of a 60-foot-high bank overlooking a lake. Much of the land has been altered, and no clear layout can be made, but there are enough deposit remains to be able to identify several features.

Recent GIS (Geographic Information System) analysis has led to the discovery of defense walls that were previously mentioned by the French in 1716.

A multitude of artifacts were also found scattered around the site suggesting that production of these artifacts may have been occurring onsite.

== 1959 excavations ==
In 1959 evacuations took place with the joint efforts of the State Historical Society, the Wisconsin Archaeological Survey and the Oshkosh Public Museum, under the direction of Warren L. Wittry of the Cranbrook Institute of Science. Large portions of the excavation and faunal assemblage were done with the help of the University of Wisconsin-Oshkosh in 1990s.

=== Features ===
Features identified at the site include:

- the remains of a palisade or defensive wall
- 45 storage/refuse pits
- a bear skull placed in a manner suggestive of the early historic practice of bear ceremonialism
- a burial of 3 dogs suggestive of the early historic practice of dog sacrifice. Dog burials have also been noted at a site in St. Ignace, Michigan, and there are accounts from early French explorers describing the practice among Great Lakes tribes.
- a human burial; several other burials were uncovered when the site was originally discovered in 1911
- several post molds suggestive of a house structure(s)

=== Artifacts ===
A wide variety of artifacts were recovered, including bone and antler artifacts, brass artifacts, pottery, stone tools, glass artifacts, ground and polished stone artifacts, iron artifacts, lead artifacts, shell artifacts and smoking pipes.

=== Pottery ===
Pottery – A, C, D, E are type 1; B is type 2

Four pottery types were noted at the site:

- Bell site type 1 – represented by 1,079 sherds and one complete restored vessel. This type consists of grit-tempered, smooth-surfaced spherical vessels with everted rims. Decoration consists of punctates and incised lines. Strap handles are present on some vessels. This pottery type has also been noted at the Arrowsmith site in central Illinois and sites in the area of Saginaw, Michigan. The cultural affiliation is believed to be the Meskwaki people.
- Bell site type 2 – represented by 171 sherds. This type consists of grit-tempered, spherical vessels with everted rims. Exterior surfaces are cord marked from the neck down with the neck area well-smoothed. No decorations were noted other than finger-crimping of the rim. This type has also been found at the Rock Island site in Door County, Wisconsin. The cultural affiliation is believed to be the Potawatomi people.
- Lake Winnebago focus – 23 sherds were thought by the authors to be affiliated with this Oneota pottery type. These sherds were shell-tempered with smooth surfaces. Cultural affiliation is thought to possibly be the Ho-Chunk people.
- LaSalle filleted – represented by 3 rim sherds. This type is grit-tempered with cordmarked surface. Fillets and strap handles were noted on individual sherds. This pottery type has been noted in the Starved Rock area of Illinois.

=== Other finds ===
Shell tempered ceramics were found in certain pit features that were able to be dated to the Mississippian Period with AMS (Accelerator Mass Spectrometry) which used Carbon to provide relative dates. Charred corn remains were also used to further back the claim.

27 features pits that were typically used as trash bins, were selected to be analyzed. Using a variety of techniques such as floatation and soil screening, archaeologists set out to look for remains of bears and dogs.

Bear remains were small compared to the multitude found for other fauna reinforcing the claim that they were sacred. Mostly skulls were found so the remains of bears were buried carefully. In the areas where these bear remains were found there was also a high diversity of other flora and fauna which correlates with feasting activity.

Dog remains were more diverse and commonly found as they were found in more than half of the 27 pits excavated. The majority of remains were found with evidence that they were used for consumption and with other disposed food remains. Most of the dog remains were scattered and did not make up large portions of the pits they were found in. The treatment of dogs varied across sites, some were buried and others sacrificed.

== Significance ==
Archaeologists have found great difficulty in identifying the material culture of the Great Lakes Indian tribes and tracing it back to prehistoric times. At the time of European contact, tribes were moving around and becoming displaced due to conflicts such as the Iroquois wars, as well as the changing economic patterns brought about by the fur trade. As a result, it's difficult for archaeologists to place tribes accurately in their prehistoric homeland. Furthermore, after contact with Europeans, the tribes traded for items such as brass kettles and steel knives which replaced the native pottery and stone tools. Thus, the material culture vanished and in many cases created a disconnect in the archaeological record between the prehistoric and historic periods.

With the discovery of the Bell site, for the first time Meskwaki material culture could be observed in an intact early historic context. The Bell site type 1 pottery style can be attributed to the Meskwaki tribe with confidence since it is the predominant pottery type present at the site. Subsequently, excavations at a known Potawatomi site (Rock Island) yielded Bell site type II pottery, which indicates that pottery type was manufactured by the Potawatomi. In both cases, this was the first time that specific pottery styles could be attributed with confidence to either tribe.

=== Meskwaki history ===
Meskwaki, also known as Fox, spoke Algonquian and were agriculturists. Algonquian speaking groups typically gave bears and dogs great importance in ritualistic activity. Meskwaki origins began in Michigan but migrated around the mid 1700s to Northern Wisconsin.

They were excluded from fur trade when French contact began and moved down to Southern Wisconsin to engage in it, settling around important water sources. They gained much economic and political control that tension began to emerge between the French and other tribal groups. They would purposely aligned themselves with their enemies enemy to generate further tension. The Meskwaki Grand Village was attacked twice in 1716 and 1728 but was able to be rebuilt. In 1730, the Meskwaki were finally beaten by French and their Indian allies and they fled from Wisconsin. The few that remained settled in southwestern Wisconsin and northwestern Illinois.

== Animals of significance ==
There is written record about the relationship Native American people, specifically the Great Lake societies, have with animals. They believe that certain animals have spirits that can rival that of actual humans and if worshipped correctly, can provide benefits outside of the material realm.

Bears held a special place in ritualistic activities. They were seen as a representation of great hunting, healing and danger. After killing a bear, certain ritual activities were performed with the remaining body parts. Animal skin is worn for a dance done in hopes of emulating the healing properties bears are said to have. The remains of the bones are then buried with decorations and placed at a high altitude to avoid animals scavenging which can disrupt the bear's spirit and invoke its anger.

Dogs, on the other hand, have varied in their spiritual importance. Throughout time, some were buried and some were sacrificed. Some believed that dogs have souls like humans and can function as the vessel connecting the spirit world to the physical one which is why they were used as companions. Some people were even buried with their dogs to serve them as guides in the afterworld. Early twentieth-century Meskaki in specific believed that consuming dogs would give them access to the dogs spiritual powers and so consumed dogs in ritual settings.
