= Shiloh Indian Mounds Site =

- Shiloh Indian Mounds National Historic Landmark; 40 HR 7
- U.S. National Register of Historic Places
- U.S. National Historic Landmark
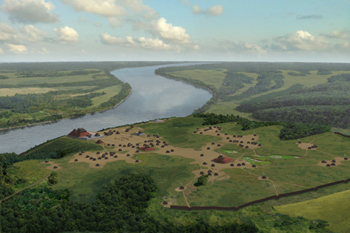
- Aerial illustration of the Shiloh Mounds Site

- Location within Tennessee
- Location: Hardin County, Tennessee
- Nearest city: Savannah, Tennessee
- Coordinates: 35°08′29″N 88°19′15″W
- Area: 81 acres (33 ha)
- Architect: Mississippian culture
- Architectural style: Mounds
- NRHP reference No.: 79000279

Significant dates
- Added to NRHP: April 27, 1979
- Designated NHL: May 5, 1989

Shiloh Indian Mounds Site (40HR7) is an archaeological site of the South Appalachian Mississippian culture (a regional variation of the Mississippian culture). It is located beside the Tennessee River on the grounds of the Shiloh National Military Park, in Hardin County of southwestern Tennessee. A National Historic Landmark, it is one of the largest Woodland era sites in the southeastern United States.

== History ==
The site was inhabited starting around 1000 CE by a Late Woodland culture indigenous peoples, and then later by those of an Early Mississippian culture, until it was abandoned in approximately 1350 CE.

=== Site ===
The Shiloh Indian National Historic Landmark is situated on a high bluff, between two ravines, overlooking the Tennessee River at the edge of the Shiloh Plateau. The village was encircled by a wooden palisade, while the village itself consisted of more than 100 wattle and daub houses, over three dozen individual house mounds, and eight mounds. Seven of the mounds were substructure platform mounds and the seventh was a Woodland period conical burial mound. It was the largest site in the region and probably functioned as the center of a country that occupied 20 miles (32 km) stretch of the Tennessee River Valley. The chiefdom held sway over six smaller villages, each with a mound or two, and many scattered farmsteads up and down the valley. The southernmost mound served as a burial place for leaders and other important people. This mound was oval shaped with a round top. A map of the site can be found on the Shiloh Indian Mounds website.

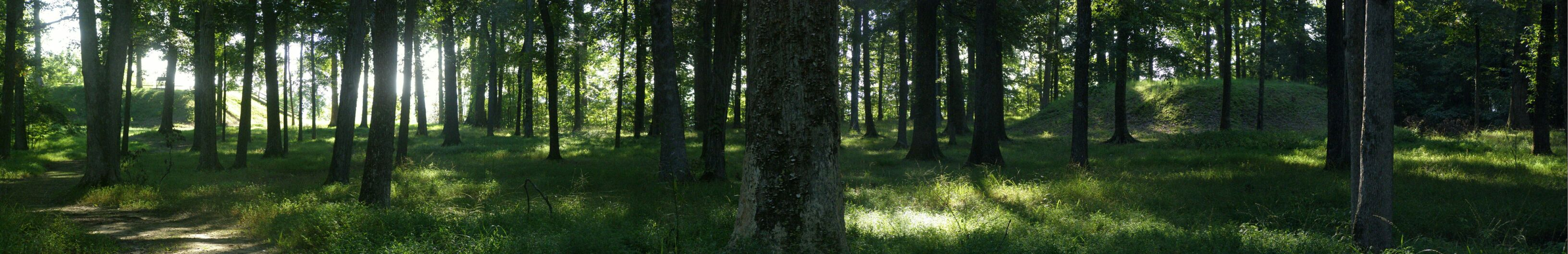
Shiloh Indian Mounds: Community center (looking east).

== Agriculture and food ==
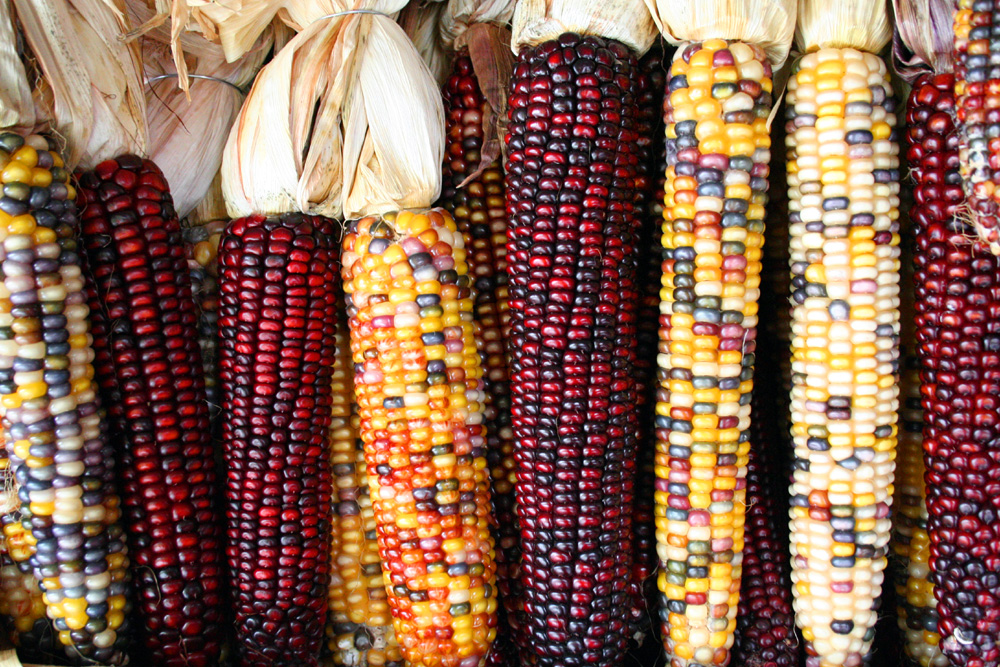
Maize was the main foodstuff grown by the peoples of Shiloh Mounds

The people of Shiloh Mounds were intensely involved in maize agriculture, as well as other food crops originating in the Americas, such as squash, sunflowers, goosefoot, marshelder, and maygrass. They also gathered wild foodstuffs such as acorns and hickory nuts. The hunting of whitetail deer, squirrel, rabbit, turkey, and raccoon as well as fishing were also important.

== Contemporaries ==
In addition to the Shiloh site, the chiefdom included six smaller towns (each with one or two mounds such as the Swallow Bluff Island Mounds site), and isolated farmsteads scattered on higher ground in the river valley. Downstream on the river's eastern bank, at the present location of Savannah, Tennessee, was another palisaded multiple mound settlement, although it is still unclear if the sites were occupied at the same time. Other neighbors had communities all along the Tennessee and Tombigbee Rivers, with sites in Alabama, Mississippi, and western Tennessee. Archaeologists think the presence of prestige goods from the Cahokia site in Illinois means the people of Shiloh Mounds were more closely tied politically to that area than to chiefdoms in the Middle Tennessee area.

== Archaeology ==
Because the site has been included within the Shiloh National Military Park boundaries for so long it has never been disturbed by modern farming techniques. The remains of the original structures of wattle and daub are still visible as low rings or mounds. It is one of the few places in the eastern U.S. where such remains are still visible. It was added to the National Register of Historic Places in 1979, and declared a National Historic Landmark in 1986.

=== Excavations ===
Cornelius Cadle, chairman of the Shiloh Park Commission, undertook the first archaeological excavations at Shiloh in 1899. He had a trench dug into the conical burial mound, Mound C. Amongst the discoveries was a large stone effigy pipe in the shape of a kneeling man. It has since become the site's most famous artifact and is on display in the Tennessee River Museum in Savannah, Tennessee. The pipe is carved from a distinctive material, Missouri flint clay, and in the same style as other statuettes from the Cahokia site in Collinsville, Illinois.

In the winter of 1933-34 survey work was undertaken at the site and many 10 feet (3.0 m) to 20 feet (6.1 m) diameter house mounds were discovered. Many contained the remains of wattle and daub houses, which had been built with walls of vertical posts interlaced with branches and coated with a thick layer of clay. It was at this time that the encircling palisade was also discovered.

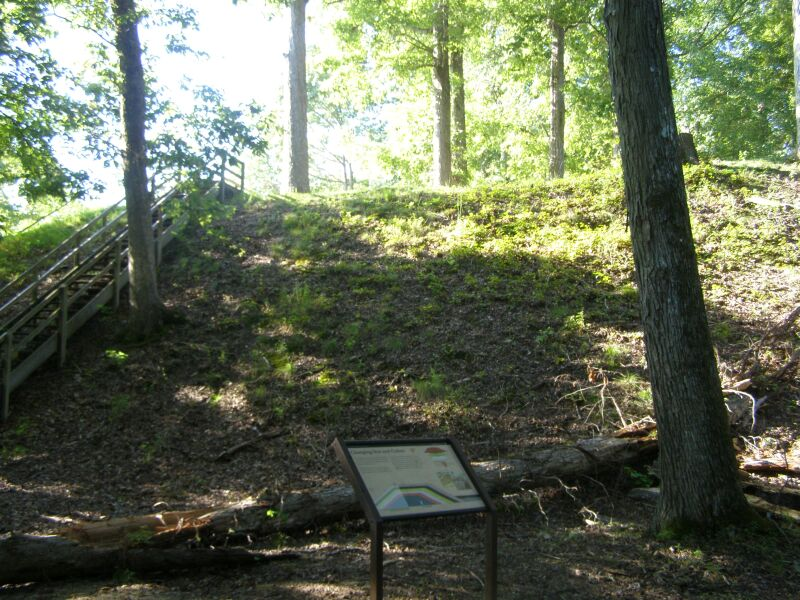
Temple Mound

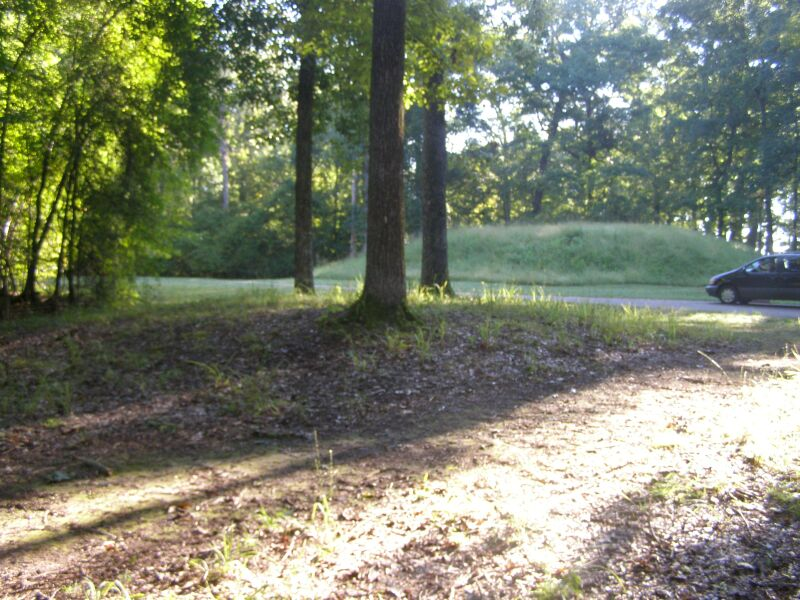
Two House platforms, lower mound (left center), higher mound center back

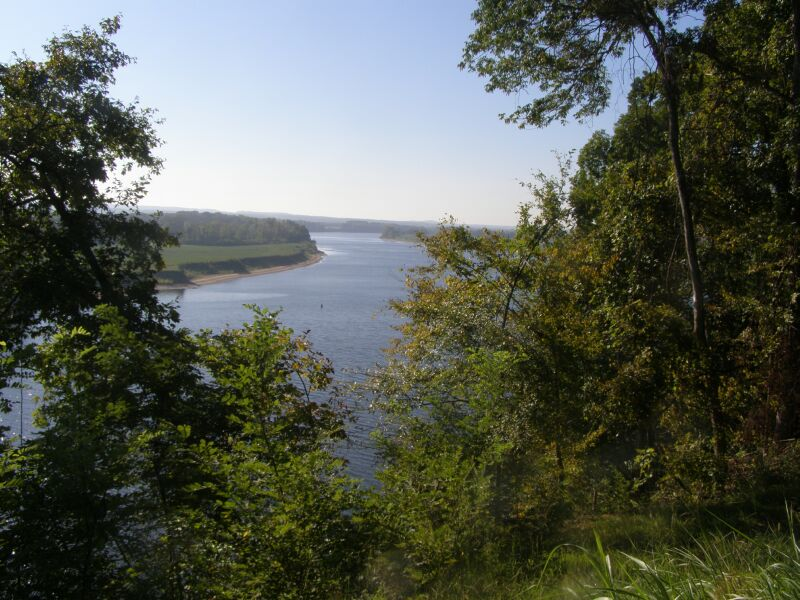
Tennessee River from Temple Mound

== See also ==
- Savannah Archaeological Site
- Swallow Bluff Island Mounds
- List of Mississippian sites
- List of National Historic Landmarks in Tennessee
- National Register of Historic Places listings in Hardin County, Tennessee
