= University of Tennessee Agriculture Farm Mound =

- U. T. Agriculture Farm Mound
- U.S. National Register of Historic Places
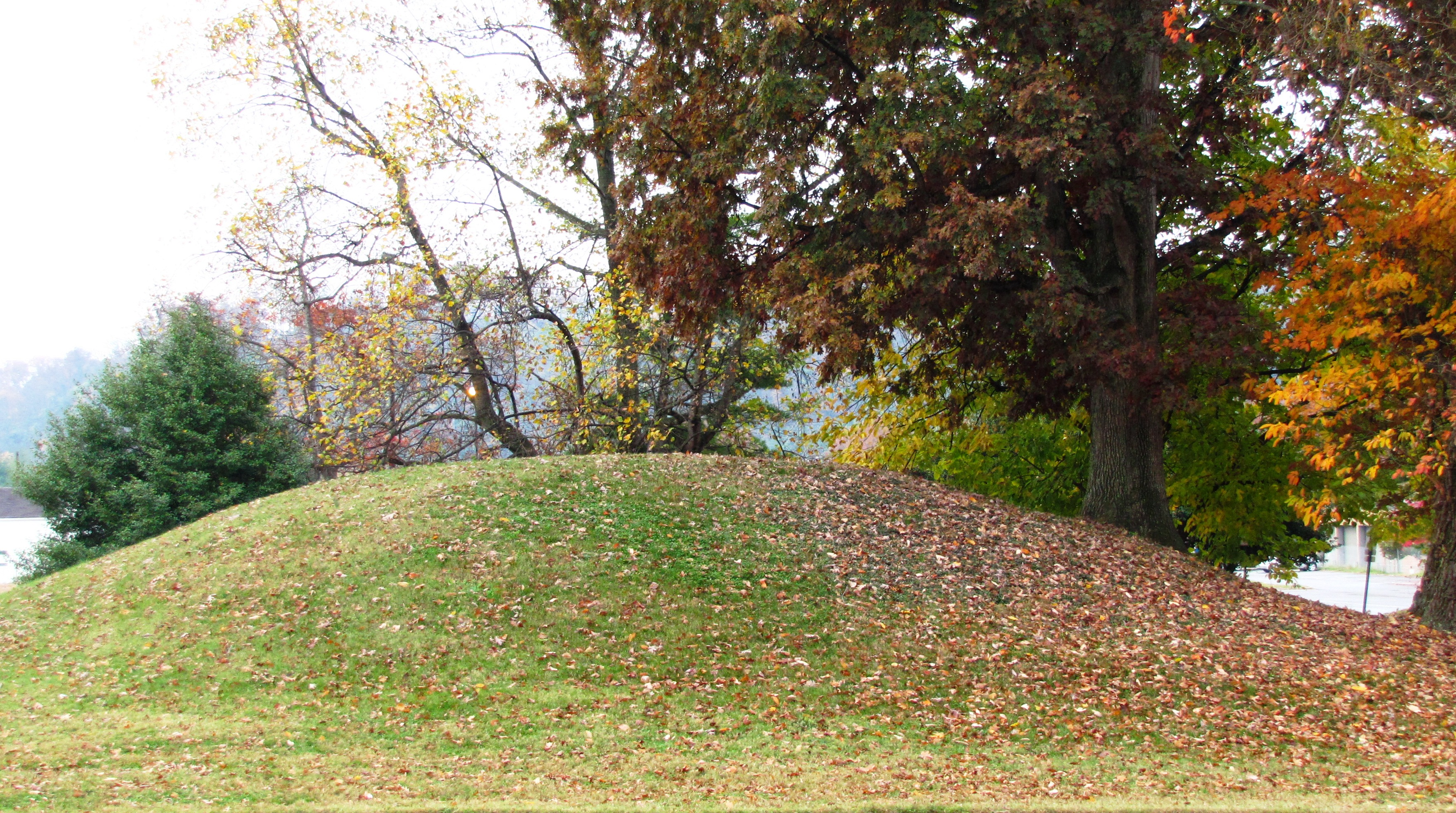
- Nearest city: Knoxville, Tennessee
- Coordinates: 35°56′50.3″N 83°56′23.5″W
- NRHP reference No.: 78002603
- Added to NRHP: March 30, 1978

The University of Tennessee Agriculture Farm Mound is an archaeological site on the agriculture campus of the University of Tennessee in Knoxville, Tennessee. The site is a burial mound made by people of the Woodland period and has been dated as early as 644 AD. Today, the site is a landmark on the University of Tennessee campus and is listed in the National Register of Historic Places.

== Location ==
The site is located at the University of Tennessee (UT) Agricultural Campus at the corner of Joe Johnson Drive and Chapman Drive. In 2011, a garden was built around the site to protect it from "construction damage" and attract interest and attention to the mound. The design of the garden was developed by Hendrik van de Werken and Don Williams, professors of Ornamental Horticulture and Landscape Design at the university, and was revised by Sam Rogers, Department of Plant Sciences. The president of the Tennessee Chapter of Gamma Sigma Delta (The Honor Society of Agriculture), Fred Allen, proposed the project to the UT Chapter in 2008 "as a long term service project to enhance the educational opportunities and aesthetic beauty of the site". Project directors enlisted the help of the Eastern Cherokee tribe and Tribal Historic Preservation. Principal Chief Michell Hicks attended the ribbon-cutting ceremony, and elder Myrtle Driver blessed the site.

According to the UT Institute of Agriculture, "The goal of the project is to honor the Native American tradition dating back to 644 A.D. when the Woodland People used burial mounds as a way of burying and honoring their deceased."

== See also ==
- Mound builder (people)
- Earthwork (archaeology)
