= Indian Grave Gap =

Valley in Georgia, United States

Coordinates: 34°47′34.34″N 83°42′50.63″W

Indian Grave Gap is a valley in Towns County, Georgia.

According to tradition, Indian Grave Gap was named for a Native American Indian's grave which is topped by a cairn.
