= Ferdinand Van Derveer =

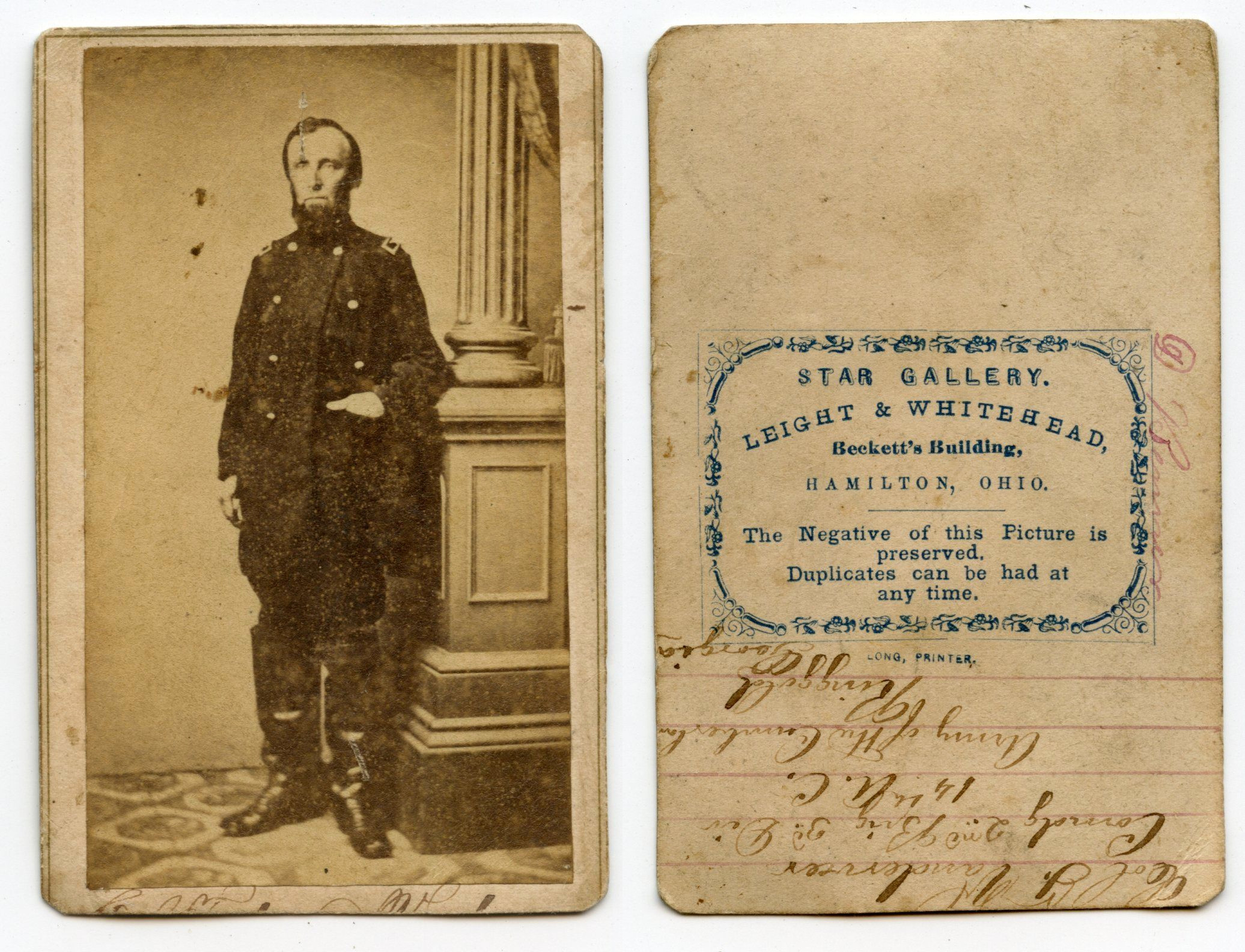
- Born: February 27, 1823; Middletown, Ohio, US
- Died: November 5, 1892 (aged 69); Butler County, Ohio, US
- Burial place: Greenwood Cemetery
- Military career
- Allegiance: United States; Union
- Branch: United States Army; Union Army
- Rank: Brigadier General
- Unit: 1st Ohio Volunteers
- Commands: 35th Ohio Infantry Regiment various infantry brigades
- Conflicts: Mexican–American War; Battle of Monterrey; American Civil War; Battle of Mill Springs; Battle of Perryville; Battle of Stones River; Battle of Missionary Ridge; Battle of Chickamauga
- Other work: Lawyer and Judge

Ferdinand Van Derveer (February 27, 1823 – November 5, 1892) was a lawyer and a brigadier general in the Union Army during the American Civil War.

Van Derveer was born in Middletown, Ohio. He was educated at Farmer's College, studied law, passed his bar exam and established his practice in Middletown. However, when the Mexican–American War erupted, he left his law office and enlisted in the military as a private in the 1st Ohio Volunteers. He commanded an assaulting column at the Battle of Monterrey and by the end of the war he had risen to the rank of captain. While his regiment was being mustered out Van Derveer served as a second to Capt. Carr B. White in a duel with Lt. James P. Fyffe over White's promotion to captain. Van Derveer returned home after the war and resumed his legal career. He served for a number of years as the Sheriff of Butler County, Ohio.

When the Civil War began, Van Derveer organized the 35th Ohio Infantry and became its first colonel. It originally consisted of 921 men, 750 of whom came from Butler County. The regiment fought at Mill Springs, Perryville, Stones River, Missionary Ridge, and Chickamauga, during which nearly half the men in the regiment were killed or wounded. In 1862 Van Derveer became a brigade commander in the Army of the Ohio and later in the XIV Corps. He mustered out with his regiment in September 1864 and in the next month he was promoted to brigadier general of Volunteers. In February 1865 he was assigned to lead a brigade in the IV Corps in Alabama.

After the conclusion of the war, Van Derveer returned to Butler County and served as a judge. He is buried in Greenwood Cemetery Hamilton, Ohio. His grave can be found in the Hill Section, Lot 561.

== See also ==
- List of American Civil War generals (Union)
- List of Ohio's American Civil War generals
- Ohio in the American Civil War
