= Swallow Bluff Island Mounds =

Archaeological site in Tennessee, United States of America

- Location within Tennessee today
- 35°23′25.87″N 88°9′32.51″W
- Cultures: Mississippian culture
- Location: Saltillo, Tennessee, Hardin County, Tennessee, USA
- Region: Hardin County, Tennessee

History
- Built: CE

Site notes
- Architectural styles: Platform mounds, plaza
- Archaeologists: Clarence Bloomfield Moore

The Swallow Bluff Island Mounds (40HR16) comprise a Mississippian culture archaeological site located near Saltillo on Swallow Bluff Island in the Tennessee River in Hardin County, Tennessee.

== Site ==
The Swallow Bluff Island Mounds site is the northernmost outpost of the Mississippian culture Shiloh polity, a group of communities centered on the much larger Shiloh or Savannah Mound Sites. The site featured two platform mounds, a plaza, and a village area. When Clarence Bloomfield Moore visited the site in 1914, he recorded the larger mounds' dimensions as a square 130-foot (40 m) base, with a50-foot (15 m)-diameter top platform area, and as being 18 ft (5.5 m) in height. Excavations in 2003 revealed the mound had been built up in four different construction stages. Moore also described the mounds as being very close to the river, although he did not record how close. By the late 20th century, the river had encroached onto the mound, and by the early 2000s, a significant amount of it had been eroded away.

== Excavations ==
In his 1914 visit, C. B. Moore dug into the main mound looking for pottery and other artifacts. He found over 20 stone box graves at the summit of the mound. After his visit, the site went without notice again, except by locals and looters, for almost 70 years. In the early 1980s, archaeologist Gerald Smith visited the site to investigate suspected pot looters holes, although they may actually been the remnants of Moore's "excavations". After a disastrous flood in 2003, archaeological surveys and excavations were undertaken to learn as much about the main mound as possible before it was completely claimed by the river.

== See also ==
- List of Mississippian sites
