= Broster =

Broster is a surname. Notable people with this surname include:

- Ben Broster (born 1982), English rugby union footballer
- D. K. Broster (1877–1950), English novelist and short-story writer
- John Broster (born 1945), American archaeologist
- John Broster (footballer) (1889–1959), English footballer
- Lennox Broster (1889–1965), South Africa-born surgeon
- Paul Broster (born 1973), Australian cricketer
- Tom Broster (1878–1942), Cape Colony cricketer

== See also ==
- Broster, Broster!, 1970s Swedish TV series (a combination of bror and syster)
