= Fort Blount =

- Fort Blount-Williamsburg Site
- U.S. National Register of Historic Places
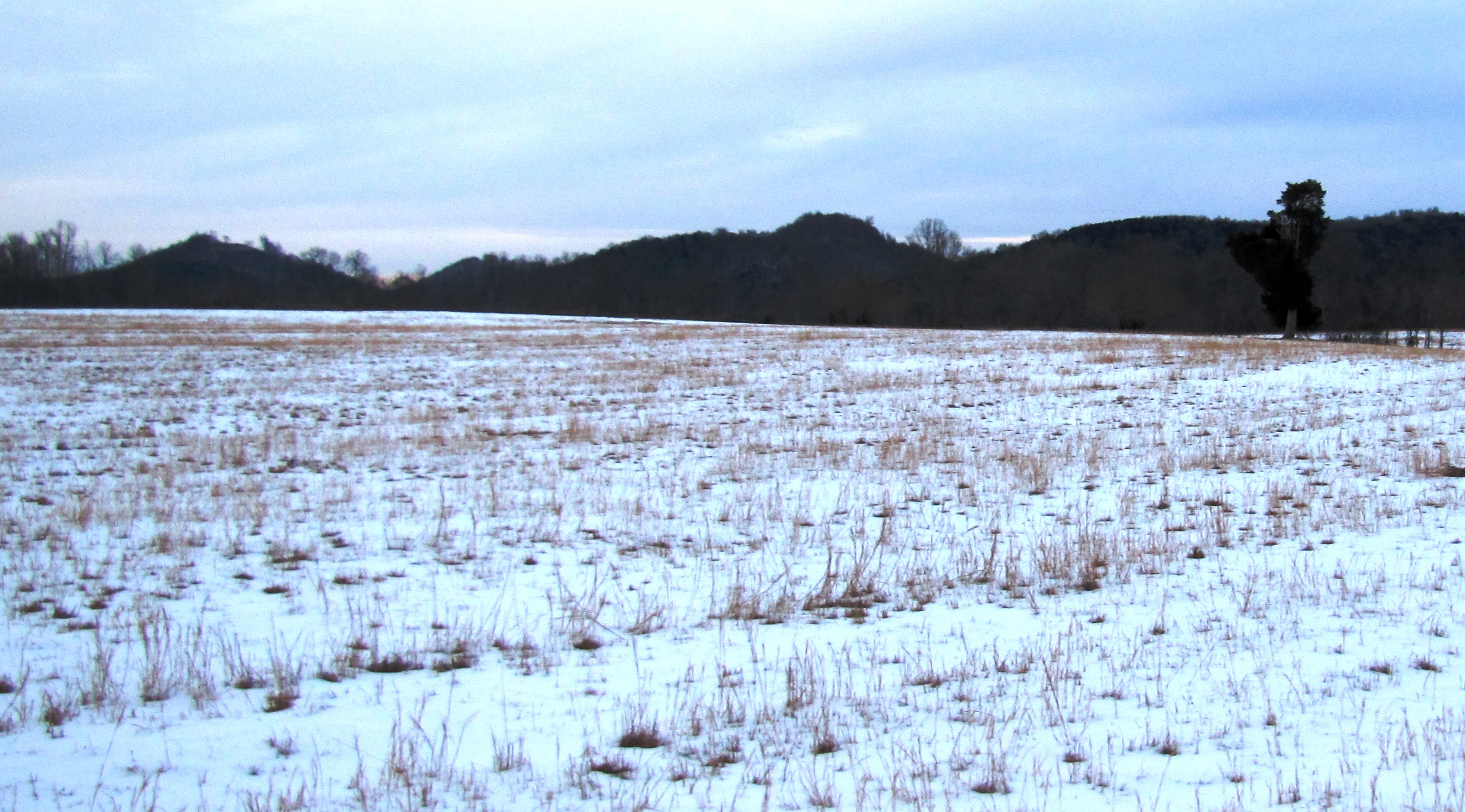
- Fort Blount site

- Location within Tennessee Location within the United States
- Location: Jackson County, Tennessee, on the Cumberland River southwest of Gainesboro
- Nearest city: Gainesboro, Tennessee
- Coordinates: 36°19′9″N 85°45′5″W
- Area: 125 acres (51 ha)
- Built: 1792-5
- NRHP reference No.: 74001918
- Added to NRHP: July 17, 1974

Fort Blount was a frontier fort and federal outpost located along the Cumberland River in Jackson County, Tennessee, United States. Situated at the point where Avery's Trace crossed the river, the fort provided an important stopover for migrants and merchants travelling from the Knoxville area to the Nashville area in the 1790s. After the fort was abandoned around 1800, the community of Williamsburg developed on the site and served as county seat for the newly formed Jackson County from 1807 and 1819. The fort and now vanished village sites were added to the National Register of Historic Places in 1974.

Constructed in 1788, Avery's Trace crossed the Cumberland River at a natural river ford known as "Crossing of the Cumberland," where sandbars made it possible to wade across for much of the year. A ferry was established in 1791, and the following year a blockhouse was built on the river's east bank. In 1794, a larger fort was constructed on the west bank of the river opposite the ferry. Eventually named for Southwest Territory governor William Blount, the fort was garrisoned by militia and later by U.S. Army regulars until it was closed in 1798. Excavations conducted by the Tennessee Division of Archaeology between 1989 and 1994 revealed the fort's location and provided evidence of its shape.

== Location ==
The Fort Blount site is on an embankment overlooking the west side of the Cumberland River about 340 miles (550 km) above the mouth of the river. (This section of the river is now part of Cordell Hull Lake). The embankment is at the eastern end of a peninsula created by a narrow turn in the river called Smith's Bend. Smith's Bend Road, which intersects Tennessee State Highway 53 in the Gladdis community 10 miles (16 km) west of Gainesboro, traverses the peninsula and provides the chief road access to the area.

The old Williamsburg community was near the Williams Cemetery, which contains the graves of early settler Sampson Williams and his wife, Margaret. It was about 1,500 feet (460 m) southwest of Fort Blount. The Fort Blount Ferry was near the end of Smith's Bend Road, which it connected to the Flynns Creek community across the river. Most of Smith's Bend is still private farmland, though the Army Corps of Engineers, which built Cordell Hull Dam, manages several recreational areas along the peninsula's lakeshore.

== History ==
=== Fort Blount ===
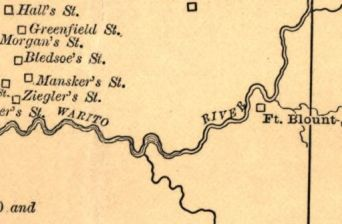
Late-19th century map showing Fort Blount in relation to Bledsoe's Station and other 18th-century outposts in Tennessee's Upper Cumberland region

In 1788, the governor of North Carolina commissioned the construction of a road to connect the Washington District of what is now East Tennessee with the Mero District in Middle Tennessee, to make it easier for travellers to cross the rugged Cumberland Plateau region. Known as Avery's Trace, the road crossed the Cumberland River at the natural ford known as the "Crossing of the Cumberland", which then was at the eastern edge of Sumner County. In 1791, Sampson Williams (1762–1841), an early Nashville pioneer and sheriff of Davidson County, was granted the right to operate a ferry at this spot.

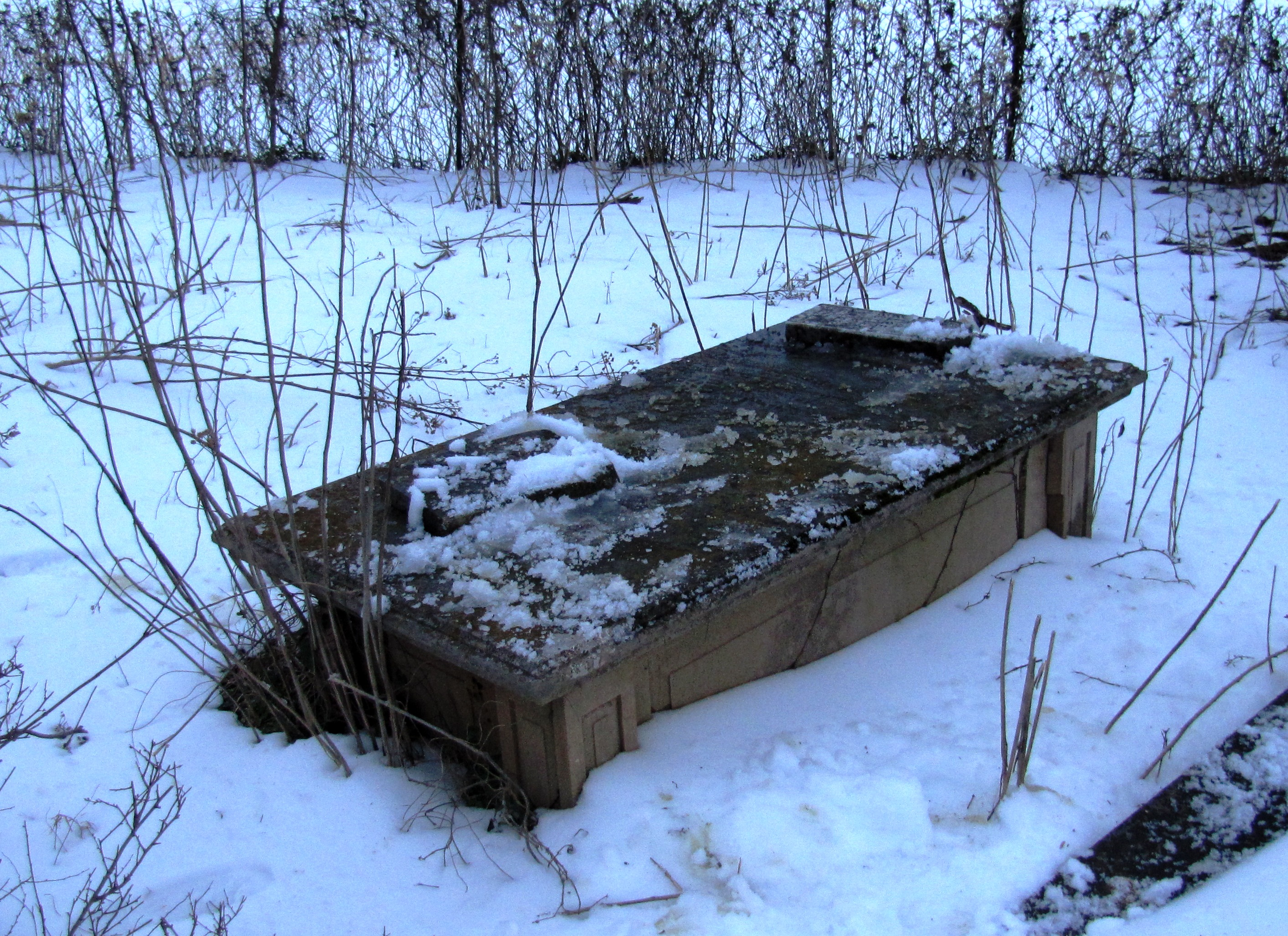
The grave of Sampson Williams (1762–1841), near the Fort Blount site

The influx of settlers to Middle Tennessee after the American Revolution agitated tensions between the Native Americans and white settlers, and Indian attacks rose sharply. A series of small forts, called "stations," were built throughout Middle Tennessee during the 1780s and 1790s. In 1792, Governor William Blount instructed Sampson Williams to raise a militia force and built a blockhouse at the Crossing of the Cumberland. The blockhouse was completed in late 1792 or early 1793, possibly with help from a detachment led by Major Hugh Beard, and was sometimes called "Beard's blockhouse." Williams was commissioned a lieutenant and commanded the garrison, which consisted of a handful of local volunteer militiamen.

In 1794, Secretary of War Henry Knox— who believed blockhouses were inadequate protection— suggested that Governor Blount replace the blockhouse with a strong stockade. The new fort was completed in 1794 and was called "Fort Blount". Sampson Williams, who had established a tavern at the ferry, provided provisions for the fort's garrison. The original militia garrison was commanded by William Gillespie for most of 1795 and by Oliver Williams (Sampson's brother) in 1796. After Tennessee became a state in 1796, Governor John Sevier discharged the militia garrison, and the following year a company of U. S. regulars commanded by Captain William Rickard took charge of the post. The garrison, which guarded the supply lines, was there only a few months. By February 1798, Fort Blount was abandoned.

In 1796, French botanist André Michaux was staying at Fort Blount when he discovered the rare American yellowwood tree in the surrounding forests. The following year, future French King Louis-Philippe passed through Fort Blount, and reported it was being modified or replaced. In 1802, Michaux's son, François André Michaux (1770–1855), travelling with prominent early Middle Tennessean Moses Fiske, stayed at the Williams' tavern. He reported that Fort Blount had been demolished.

=== Williamsburg ===
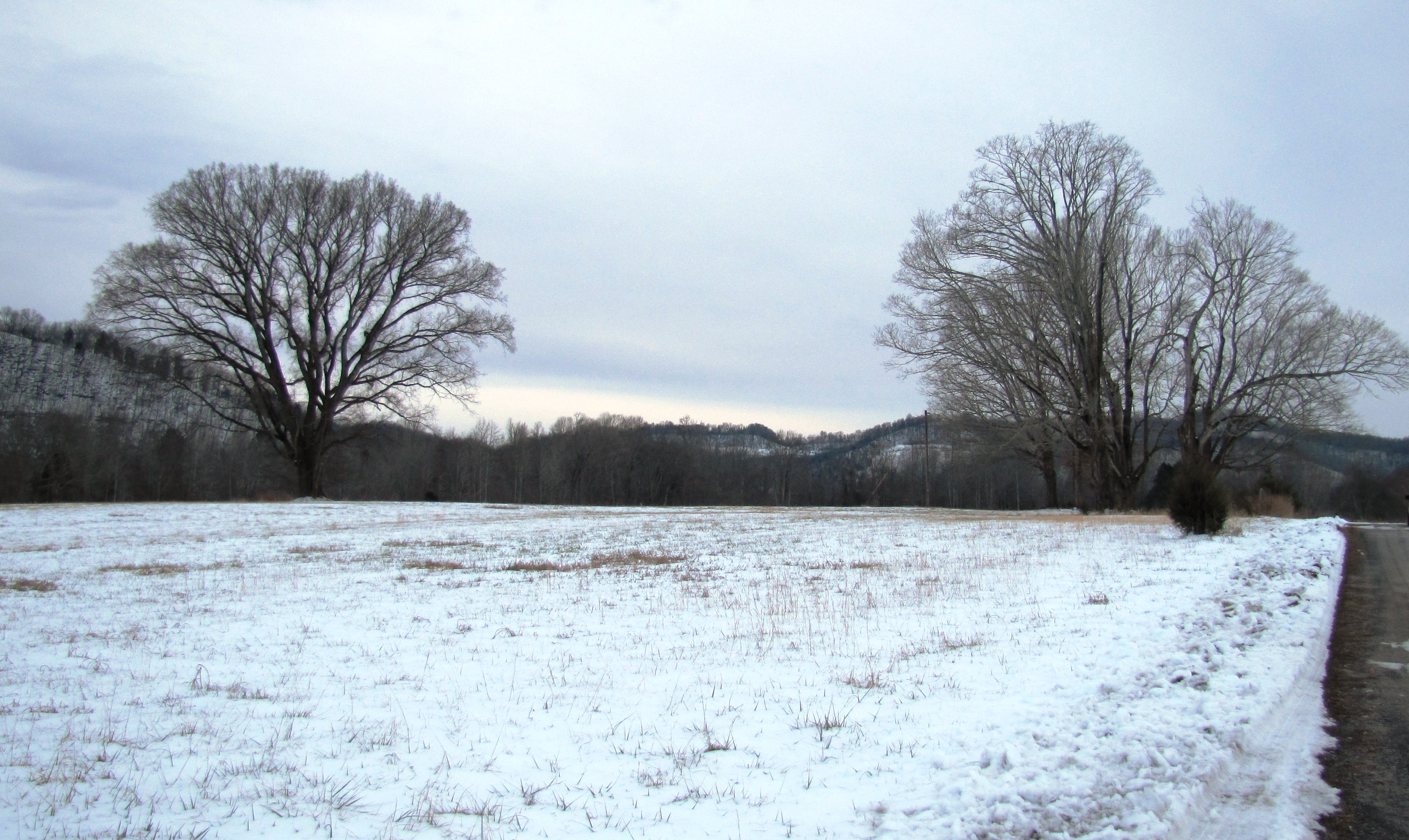
The site of Williamsburg, looking toward what was once the jail and courthouse

After the closure of the fort, Sampson Williams purchased most of the property and adjacent land, establishing a sizeable plantation. In 1800, the "Fort Blount" post office opened with Williams as post master. Until 1805, Williams' land was part of Smith County, and the Smith County court convened at Williams' tavern several times. In 1805, the county boundaries were redrawn, and the Williams plantation was now in Jackson County. In 1806, the Tennessee legislature authorized the purchase of 60-acre (24 ha) of the Williams farm to create a county seat. The town was incorporated as "Williamsburg" the following year.

Besides the courthouse and jail, completed in 1808, Williamsburg included a hotel, a general store, and at least five houses, reached by the Fort Blount ferry. Residents in eastern Jackson County complained that the courthouse was too far away, requiring them to make a 2-day round trip. In 1818, Jackson County voters moved the seat to a more central location and the town of Gainesboro was established. Williamsburg was de-incorporated in 1820.

=== Later history ===
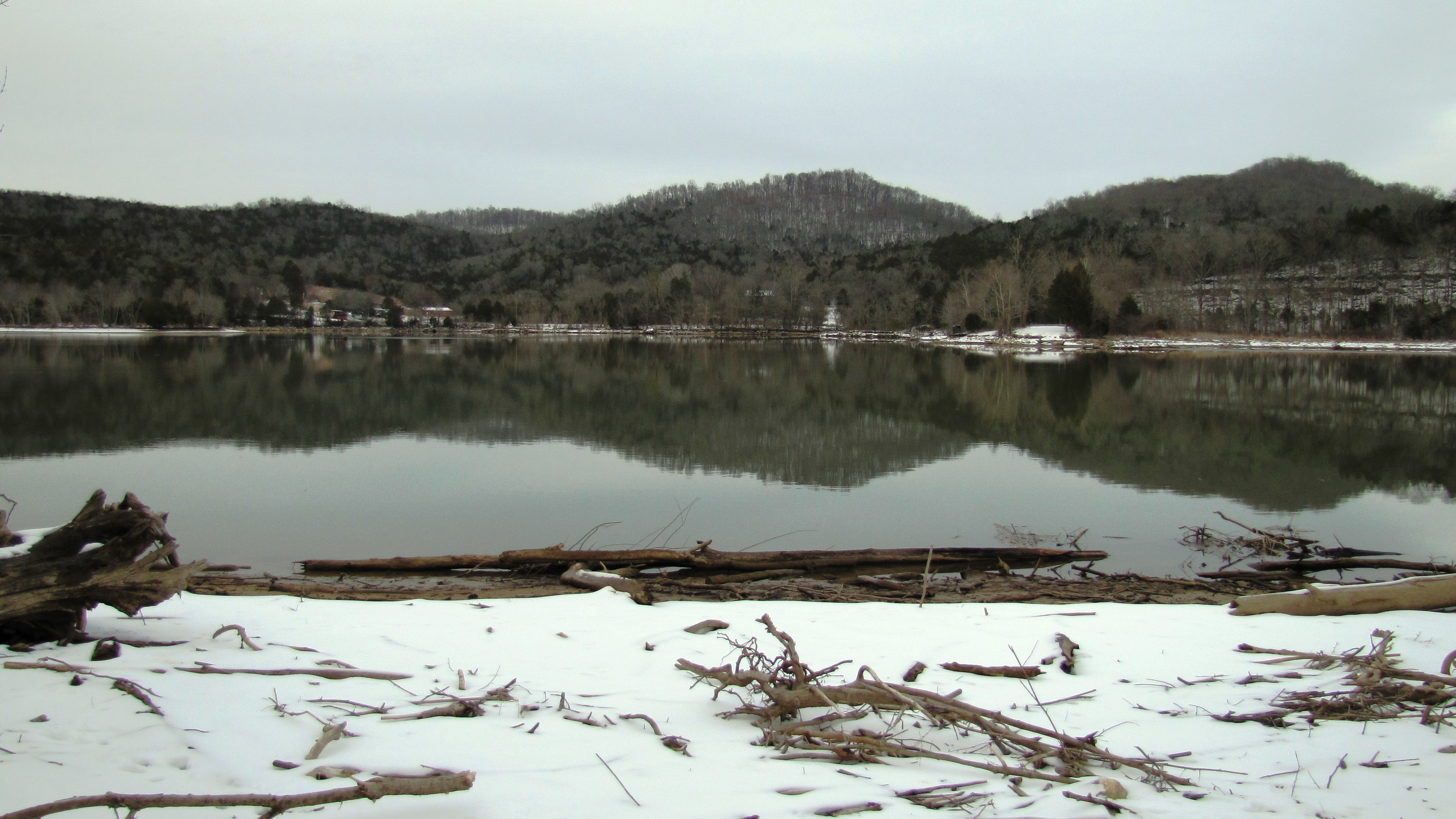
View of the Cumberland River at the former site of Fort Blount Ferry

After the county seat's removal, Sampson Williams purchased the old courthouse, which he modified as an elaborate residence. He continued to operate an inn and ferry, and his plantation grew to several hundred acres and worked by 20 or 30 slaves. After his death in 1841, his son-in-law Andrew McClellan inherited the plantation. On McClellan's death in 1850, the plantation was placed in a trust for McClellan's children. They sold the land to John Pruett in 1869, and when Pruett died 10 years later, it passed to his daughter Sallie and son-in-law James Fox. It remained in the Fox family until the mid-20th century. The Fox house, which appears on a 1931 map of the area, may have been on the site of the old courthouse. The Fort Blount Ferry operated until 1974.

In the early 1960s, the U.S. Army Corps of Engineers surveyed the area for the construction of Cordell Hull Dam (located several miles downstream near Carthage). Using old maps and land grant boundaries, the Corps identified a 125-acre (51 ha) plot believed to have been the site of Fort Blount and Williamsburg, and in 1974 placed this plot on the National Register of Historic Places as the "Fort Blount-Williamsburg site." Later research and excavations conducted by the Tennessee Division of Archaeology, however, placed both Fort Blount and Williamsburg just outside the listing's boundaries.

== Archaeological investigations ==
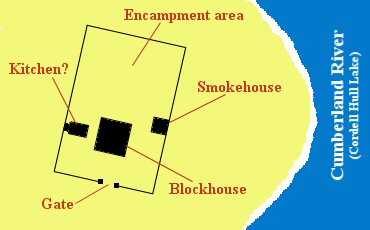
Layout of Fort Blount, as determined by the 1989–1994 excavations

Between 1989 and 1994, Samuel Smith of the Tennessee Division of Archaeology led a team that conducted extensive excavations of the Fort Blount-Williamsburg site, designated 40JK125. The excavations, which focused primarily on the fort itself, uncovered the remains of a prehistoric structure, three structures likely associated with Fort Blount, and several thousand artifacts. Their findings were published in 2000.

The largest structural remnant found by excavators, known as "Building 1," consisted of a 21-foot (6.4 m) by 21-foot (6.4 m) limestone foundation that once supported a wooden structure. Excavators determined this structure to be a blockhouse, based on its size, square shape, and the design of contemporary blockhouses. Just west of Building 1 was "Building 2," only a few remains of which survived, most notably a chimney. Although its purpose is indeterminable, excavators suggested it may have been a kitchen. Slightly northeast of Building 1 was "Building 3," which had a foundation that measured 13 feet (4.0 m) by 12 feet (3.7 m). The remains of two hearths and evidence that a wooden structure hung over one of the hearths suggest that this was a smokehouse.

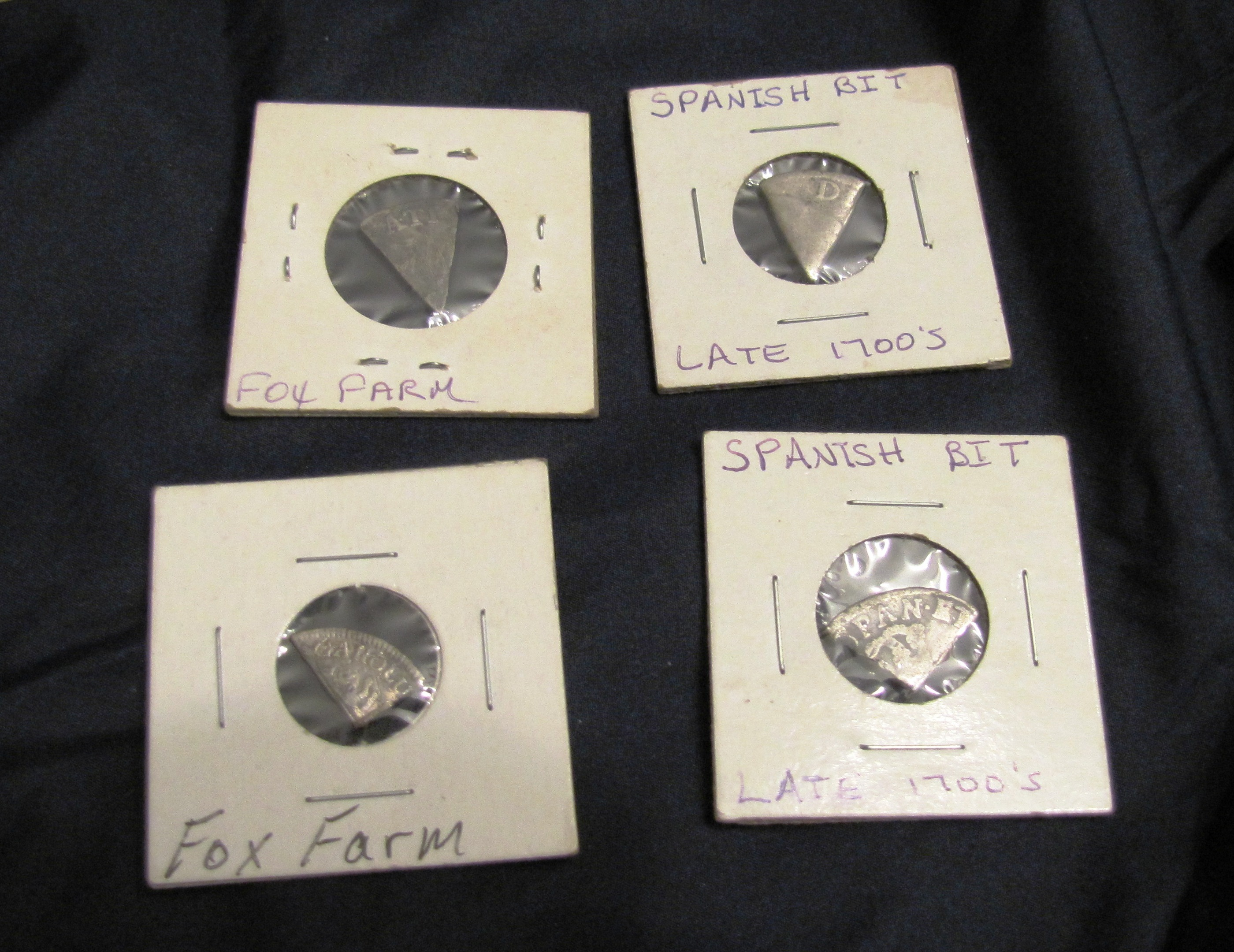
Spanish coins found near the Fort Blount-Williamsburg sites (Gene Smith collection)

Evidence for an outer wall surrounding all three structures was provided by postholes and vegetation lines. Four postholes aligned with the chimney wall of Building 2 may be remains of the western wall, and a noticeable vegetation line to the north of the structures may have been caused by what was once the fort's northern wall. The southern wall was indicated by three aligned postholes, one of which was relatively large and may have been one side of the fort's gate. The eastern wall was less apparent, but may have been aligned with the smokehouse's eastern wall. If conjecture regarding these findings is correct, the fort had dimensions of 120 feet (37 m) by 90 feet (27 m).

Prehistoric artifacts indicate the site was used as early as the Paleo-Indian period, and used extensively during the Middle Woodland period (c. 500 BC – 500 AD). Most of the site's historic-period artifacts consisted of the remains of glass containers and tableware. A number of Spanish coins— which were common on the Tennessee frontier— were recovered at the site, including one dating to 1781. Gun parts and ammunition were scant, but included lead balls, leadshot, and gunflints and flintlock parts. A pewter button found in Building 1's cellar dates to 1800 or later, and indicates that the fort likely stood until at least 1800. Excavators uncovered at least three items that were used specifically on soldiers' uniforms in the 1790s.

== See also ==
- Fort Southwest Point
- Tellico Blockhouse
