= Avery's Trace =

Avery's Trace was the principal road used by settlers travelling from the Knoxville area in East Tennessee to the Nashville area from 1788 to the mid-1830s.

In an effort to encourage settlers to move west into the new territory of Tennessee, in 1787 North Carolina ordered a road to be cut to lead settlers into the Cumberland Settlements — from the south end of Clinch mountain (in East Tennessee) to French Lick (Nashville). Peter Avery, a hunter familiar with the area, directed the blazing of this trail through the wilderness.

He had the trail laid out along trails which the Cherokee Indians had long made their own and frequently used as war paths, following passages of buffalo. It led from Fort Southwest Point at Kingston through the Cumberland Mountains up into what is now Jackson County, Tennessee to Fort Blount. From there it worked through the hills and valleys of upper Middle Tennessee to Bledsoe's Fort at Castalian Springs, then to Mansker's Fort (near modern Goodlettsville), and finally to Fort Nashborough. These five forts provided shelter and protection for travelers along the Trace.

== First travelers on the Trace ==
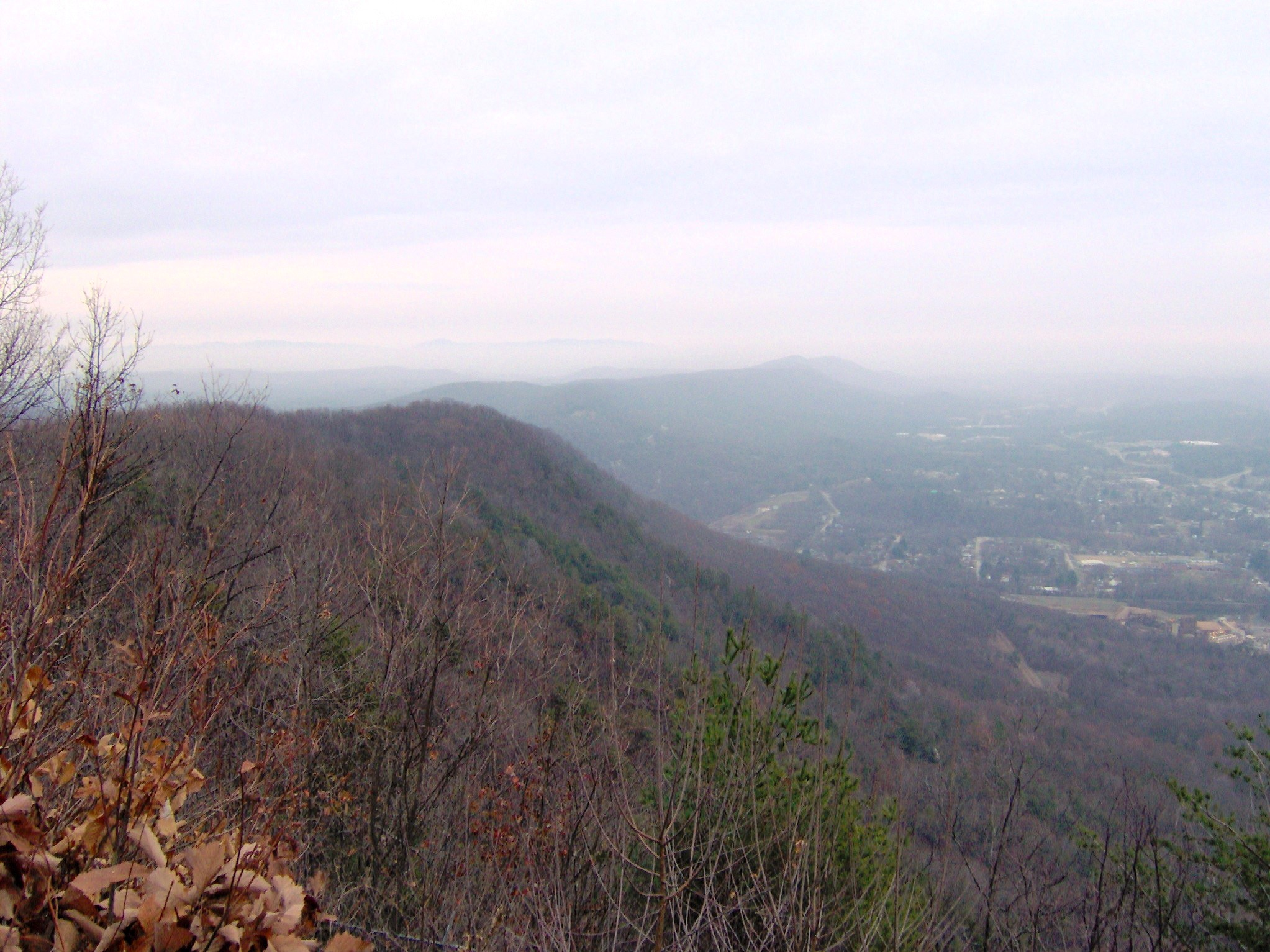
Photo from Mt. Roosevelt (Walden Ridge) showing terrain of the Cumberland Plateau

In 1787, the Assembly of North Carolina provided 300 soldiers to be available for protection at the Cumberland Settlements. The soldiers assisted Avery in laying out the Trace, and each soldier was paid with a land grant of 800 acres (3.2 km^{2}) for one year's work. A 10-foot (3 m) wide trail was cleared. In that year, 25 families traveled along the new road. By 1788, the "Trace" was still merely a rough trail marked by trees scored (or "blazed") to guide the pioneers and travelers. For several years, only people on horseback and with pack horses could follow the rugged trail. Journals of many travelers along the Trace detail hardship encountered as they journeyed for several days to make the 300-mile (480 km) trip. The Trace was called the "Walton Road," "North Carolina Road," "Avery's Trace", and sometimes "The Wilderness Road."

== Trace passes through Cherokee land ==
Because a portion of the Trace passed through Cherokee land, tribe members demanded a toll for settlers' use of the road. Disputes inevitably arose over the toll. Despite colonists and Cherokees' agreeing on a treaty designed to settle these disputes, war was declared. As a result, Cherokees killed 102 travelers along the road.

The North Carolina legislature ordered militia details of 50 men each to be maintained to escort travelers when large enough groups had gathered at the Clinch River to head west. In 1792 Americans built a blockhouse at the Clinch River. Territorial Governor William Blount placed many territorial militia on active duty under the command of General John Sevier, who based his operations at the blockhouse and began to provide armed escorts for travelers along the Trace.

== Trace widened to a wagon road ==
A few years later, the North Carolina legislature ordered widening and improvements to the Trace to upgrade it to a wagon road. They raised funds by a lottery. As a wagon road, however, the Trace still offered bone-jolting travel. Pioneers were advised to keep a close watch on their horses, which Native American hunters occasionally stole. The war over the territory had ended, so travelers no longer feared for their lives.

By the late 1790s, road conditions varied from "bottomless" to "fine and dry". Wagons often sank to their axles in mudholes. At places the Trace was covered with stone slabs, which made it difficult for horses. Much of the way was passable only on foot. Rivers and streams had to be forded. At Spencer's Mountain, now in Cumberland County, the road became very steep and full of rock slabs. It was reportedly so bad that wagons could not go down the mountain without the brakes on all wheels and with a tree hung on behind to slow them down. The mountain top was said to be "quite denuded of trees."

== Families travel to the "Promised land" ==
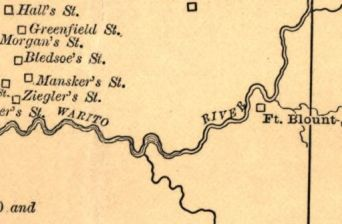
Detail showing the location of several late-18th century frontier forts (or "stations") in the Upper Cumberland River valley of Middle Tennessee.

As rough and difficult as the road was, it was the major passage to the Cumberland Settlements. Lone travelers or pioneer families would load their possessions into wagons and meet fellow pioneers at the Clinch River. When the settlers had gathered, a militia detail joined them. They drive their horses across the Clinch River to start their journey into the unknown wilderness. Many believed they would reach a "promised land" at the end of their journey; many sought lands they had been granted for service to the new country. They faced a long and tortuous trail with many hazards.

Pioneers camped along the way, cooking over campfires and sleeping under the stars. As the days wore on, they were occasionally fortunate enough to find families living along the Trace who gave them shelter and food for themselves and their horses, but these were few and far between. One traveler recorded that "the houses are so far apart from each other that you seldom see more than two or three in a day." High prices were sometimes charged for any shelter or food. The land they traveled through was rich with beautiful hills and valleys full of canebrakes, giant trees and tangled vines. Many of those who made the journey described it as 300 miles (480 km) of wilderness — one inhabited by wolves, mountain lions, coyotes, deer and buffalo herds. Along the Trace, settlers turned off for their individual land grants. By the last fort, Fort Nashborough, often only the militia remained. The soldiers usually picked up another group of settlers going back East. A traveler reported that families were constantly moving in and out of the area, "back to whence they came or onward to other settlements."

== Notable travelers on the Trace ==
Many notable people traveled along the Trace, among them Andrew Jackson, Judge John McNairy, Governor William Blount, Louis Philippe, Duke of Orléans (who later became King of France), Bishop Francis Asbury, French botanist André Michaux, Tennessee Governor Archibald Roane, and others.
