= Tellico Blockhouse =

- Tellico Blockhouse Site
- U.S. National Register of Historic Places
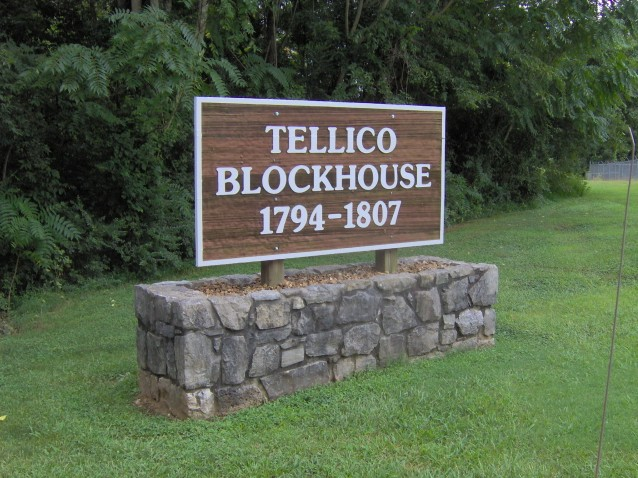
- Entrance sign to the Tellico Blockhouse State Historic Area
- Location: Vonore, Tennessee, USA
- Coordinates: 35.59988°N 84.20291°W
- NRHP reference No.: 75001771
- Added to NRHP: 1975-08-11

The Tellico Blockhouse was an early American outpost located along the Little Tennessee River in what developed as Vonore, Monroe County, Tennessee. Completed in 1794, the blockhouse was a US military outpost that operated until 1807; the garrison was intended to keep peace between the nearby Overhill Cherokee towns and encroaching early Euro-American pioneers in the area in the wake of the Cherokee–American wars.

The Tellico Blockhouse was the site where several treaties were negotiated between the United States and the Cherokee, by which the latter ceded large portions of land in present-day Tennessee and Georgia in order to try to gain peace. The US provided various financial incentives for these actions. During this period, the blockhouse was the site of official liaisons between the United States government and the Cherokee.

It was designated as the Tellico Blockhouse State Historic Area and listed in 1975 on the National Register of Historic Places. It is administered by staff of the nearby Fort Loudoun State Historic Area.

== Geographic setting ==
The Tellico Blockhouse site is located at the junction of Nine Mile Creek and the Little Tennessee River (now Tellico Lake), between Maryville and Vonore. U.S. Route 411 passes nearby. Fort Loudoun was located just across the river to the west, but it was in ruins by the time the blockhouse was built. The Tellico Blockhouse originally stood on a high bluff overlooking the Little Tennessee valley.

The Overhill towns of Chota and Great Tellico were within a day's journey to the south. The river town of Morganton (then known as "Portville") was within walking distance. Knoxville was thirty miles downstream on the Little Tennessee River and then upstream on the Tennessee River to the north. As there were no bridges built to span the Little Tennessee until the late 19th century, blockhouse officials crossed at Niles Ferry.

This ferry site was later used for the ends of the modern US-411 bridge. In 1979 the Tellico Dam was completed on the Little Tennessee River. The impoundment of the river, creating Tellico Lake, pushed the present shoreline to within a few meters of the blockhouse site.

Historically, the Tellico Blockhouse was the starting point of the Old Federal Road, which connected Knoxville to Cherokee settlements in Georgia. It was also the start of the Unicoi Turnpike, a Cherokee trading path that connected to North Carolina and north Georgia.

== History ==
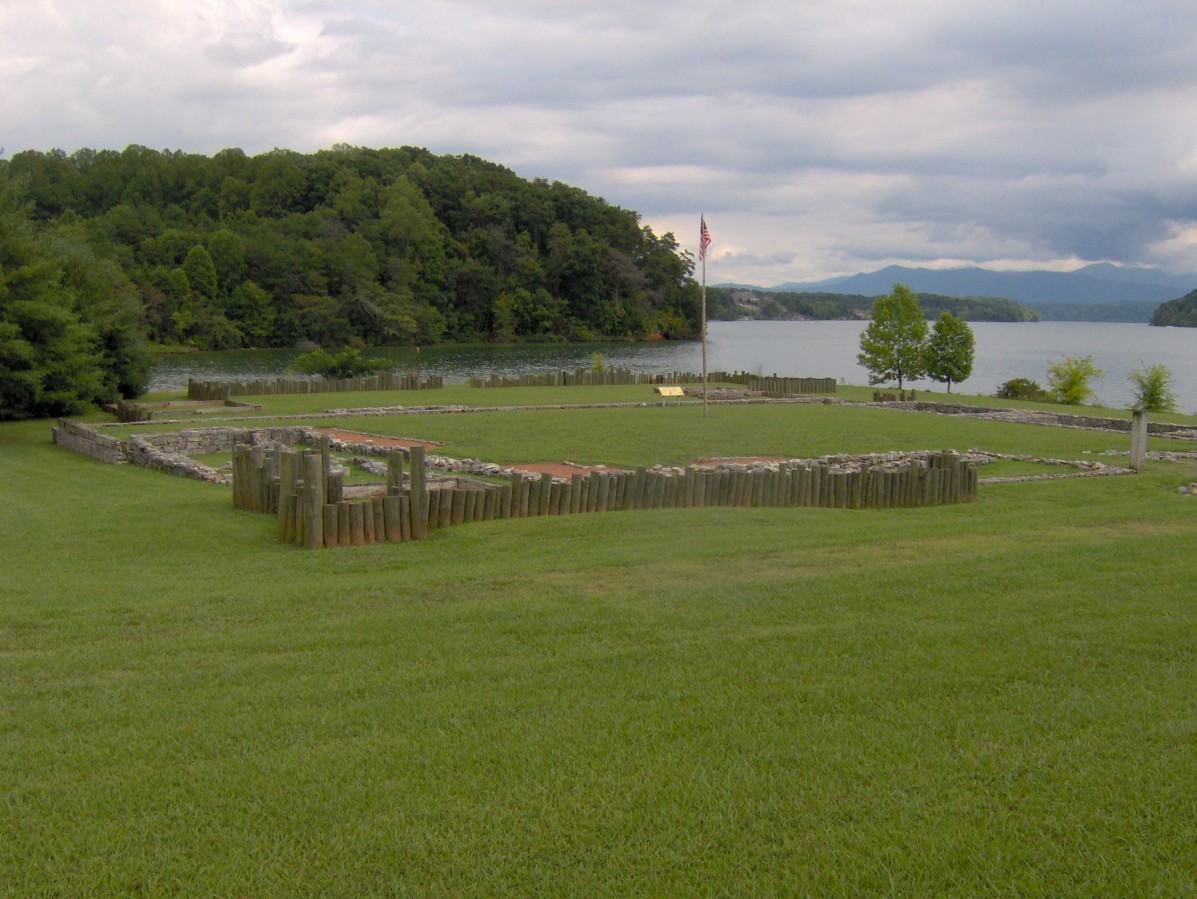
The Tellico Blockhouse site, at the confluence of Nine Mile Creek (left) and the Little Tennessee River (right)

During the second half of the 18th century, the number of Anglo-European settlers into East Tennessee rapidly increased. They came into conflict with the Cherokee, whose territory this had been for centuries. Armed confrontations developed, as the Cherokee raided the settlements and sometimes killed settlers, conducting ritual scalpings. The settlers formed independent militias and carried out reprisal attacks. This violence reached a climax in 1793, when the Cherokee attacked Henry's Station in Blount County. The pioneers responded by crossing Chilhowee Mountain and sacking the Cherokee village of Tallassee. Even as the Cherokee chief Hanging Maw was meeting with Governor William Blount to discuss bringing peace to the area, the chief's delegation was attacked by a band of settlers, who killed several Cherokee headmen.

Hanging Maw convinced Blount to construct a fort in the vicinity of the Overhill towns in order to suppress violence. The chief donated the land. The Tellico Blockhouse was completed and garrisoned by federal troops from Knoxville in 1794. John McKee, a surveyor in the area, was appointed as the first Tellico Indian Agent. He was to act as the official liaison between the United States government and the Cherokee Nation.

The blockhouse was a crude fort built from earthworks and timber. Sawed planking was shipped upstream from Knoxville.

According to historian J. G. M. Ramsey in his history originally published in 1853, it was:

...a strong work, of considerable size, with a projection on each square, furnished with port-holes, and calculated to stand a siege by an enemy provided with small arms only.

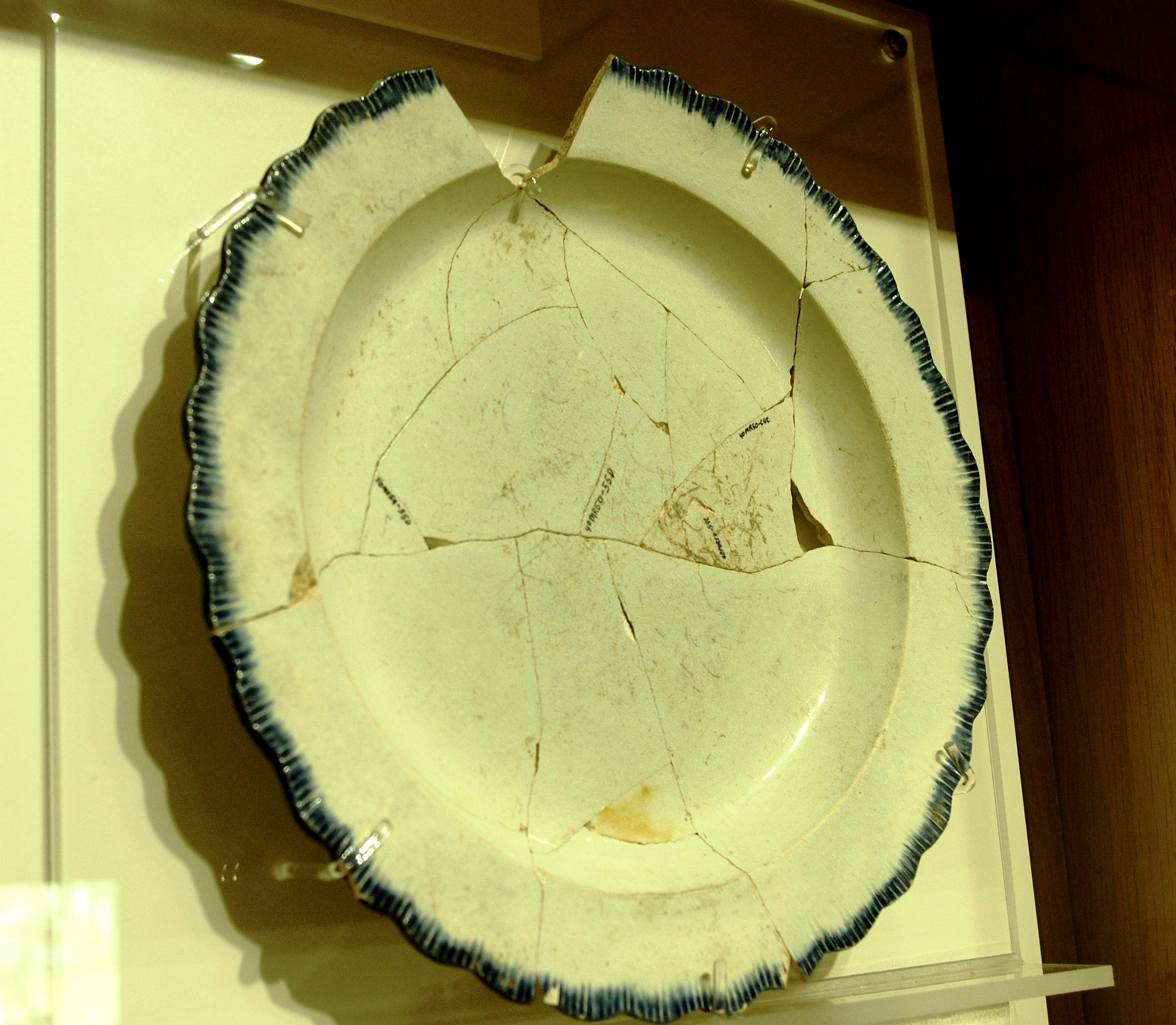
Plate uncovered during excavations at the Tellico Blockhouse site

The original blockhouse was approximately 120x100 feet, enclosed by a defensive palisade approximately 16 feet high. The gate was on the north wall, with the captain's quarters and guardhouse just inside the gate. The original enclosure contained two barracks, a well, and parade grounds. A watchtower stood at the northeast corner.

In 1795, Congress passed the Factory Act, which sought to improve relations with American Indians by setting up official trading posts and teaching the natives agricultural and mechanical techniques. To implement this, McKee's successor, Silas Dinsmoor, expanded the Tellico Blockhouse to nearly double its original size to incorporate a civilian half. This new section, separated by a wall from the military section, contained lodging areas for travelers and delegates and a two-story building known as the Tellico Factory. Along with a trading post where European-American tools and finished goods were traded for Native American furs and raw materials, the factory included a section where members of the new Cherokee Nation could learn mechanical arts, and spinning and weaving cloth.

In April 1797, the exposure of the so-called "Blount Conspiracy"—in which Senator William Blount attempted to convince Britain to attack and capture the Spanish-controlled port of New Orleans—began at the Tellico Blockhouse. James Carey, a merchant whom Blount had attempted to recruit, gave a letter from Blount detailing the conspiracy to James Byers, a government trader at the Blockhouse. Byers turned the letter over to Colonel David Henley (a foe of Blount) in Knoxville, and Henley delivered it to Secretary of State Timothy Pickering. Blount was eventually expelled from the Senate based in part on this letter.

In December 1797, one of the first recorded Christmas celebrations in Tennessee occurred among the garrison at the Tellico Blockhouse to celebrate the Little Tennessee River freezing over. On the night of December 25, Dinsmoor and the federal garrison held a dinner party on the ice.

This was later described by Ramsey from a contemporary news article:

On the 25th, a Christmas dinner was given upon the ice, by the Federal officers, at Tellico Block-house, to a large company of gentlemen and ladies. "Contiguous to the place of entertainment, two quarters of a bear were barbecued, where the ice was found to be, in thickness, sufficient to bare fire enough to have roasted an ox, without being materially weakened by the heat."

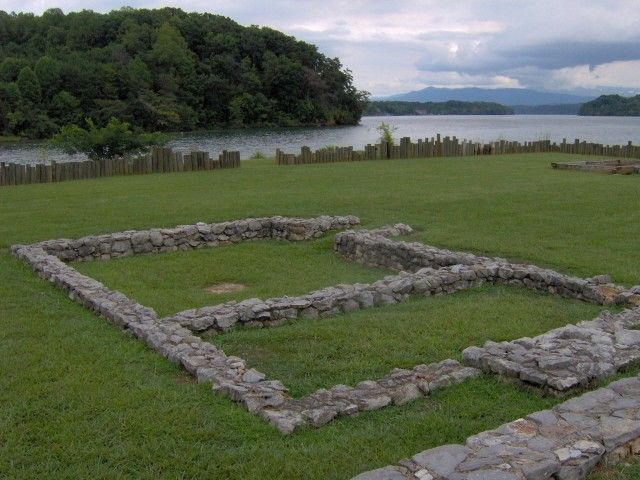
Foundation of the Tellico Factory

The Tellico Blockhouse likely had its peak of activity around 1799, due to its location along the Old Federal Road. That same year, Louis-Philippe, Duke of Orleans and later king of France, paid a visit to the blockhouse. In 1800, several Cherokee leaders convened at the blockhouse to debate whether or not to allow missionaries into Cherokee towns. The Cherokee hoped the missionaries would provide educational services to their children.

In the early 19th century, the Cherokee slowly migrated south to the Hiwassee River and deeper into Georgia, trying to escape the encroachment of European Americans. As the Overhill towns along the Little Tennessee River began to disperse, the Tellico Blockhouse's influence started to wane. In 1801, Colonel Return J. Meigs took over as Cherokee agent. This appointment effectively moved the agency to Fort Southwest Point (modern Kingston, Tennessee), where Meigs was based. In 1805, the last Tellico treaty called for the removal of the blockhouse garrison south to the Hiwassee River area.

When archeologists from the University of Tennessee conducted excavations at the Tellico Blockhouse site in the 1970s, they located the fort's foundations and a number of artifacts. Due to a lack of records, officials concluded they would not attempt a reconstruction of the blockhouse. They directed the reinforcement of foundations with authentic fill material so visitors can see the fort's layout. Short posts were erected to show the position of the blockhouse walls, and interpretive signs were placed at the site to explain the fort's brief history.

The site is preserved as a State Historic Area, listed on the National Register of Historic Places, and managed by staff of the Fort Loudoun State Historic Area. Some of the artifacts recovered during the excavation are displayed at the nearby Fort Loudoun museum and the Frank H. McClung Museum in Knoxville.

== Treaties ==
Several treaties between the United States and the Cherokee Nation were negotiated at the Tellico Blockhouse:

- A treaty signed on November 8, 1794 marked the end of the Cherokee–American wars. Cherokee chiefs Hanging Maw (representing the Upper Cherokee) and Colonel John Watt (representing the Lower Cherokee, or "Chickamauga") met with Governor William Blount to negotiate this. All sides agreed to recognize boundaries set forth in previous treaties.
- The 'First Treaty of Tellico', also known as the Treaty with the Cherokee, negotiated in 1797 and signed on October 2, 1798, was intended to compensate the Cherokee for land to be ceded to illegal settlers ("squatters"). In exchange for ceding land, the Cherokee received various financial incentives and a guarantee of the right of the Cherokee Nation to "exist forever." The U.S. negotiators, acting on instructions from Governor John Sevier, included James Robertson, Lachlan McIntosh, Thomas Butler, and James White.
- The 'Second Treaty of Tellico', signed on October 24, 1804, brought the Wafford settlements in northern Georgia under U.S. dominion. The Cherokee received various financial incentives to cede these lands to the US. Colonel Return J. Meigs negotiated the treaty for the United States.
- The 'Third Treaty of Tellico', signed on October 25, 1805, and the 'Fourth Treaty of Tellico', signed two days later on October 27, brought the land between the Cumberland River and Duck River (i.e., most of the Cumberland Plateau) under U.S. dominion by Cherokee cessions. The goal of the U.S. was to connect East Tennessee with Nashville. Both treaties were negotiated for the United States by Colonel Return J. Meigs. Two of the Cherokee negotiators, Doublehead and Tollunteeskee, were later criticized for including "secret articles" that allowed for personal incentives.

== See also ==
- Bledsoe's Station
- Fort Blount
