= Fort Southwest Point =

- Southwest Point
- U.S. National Register of Historic Places
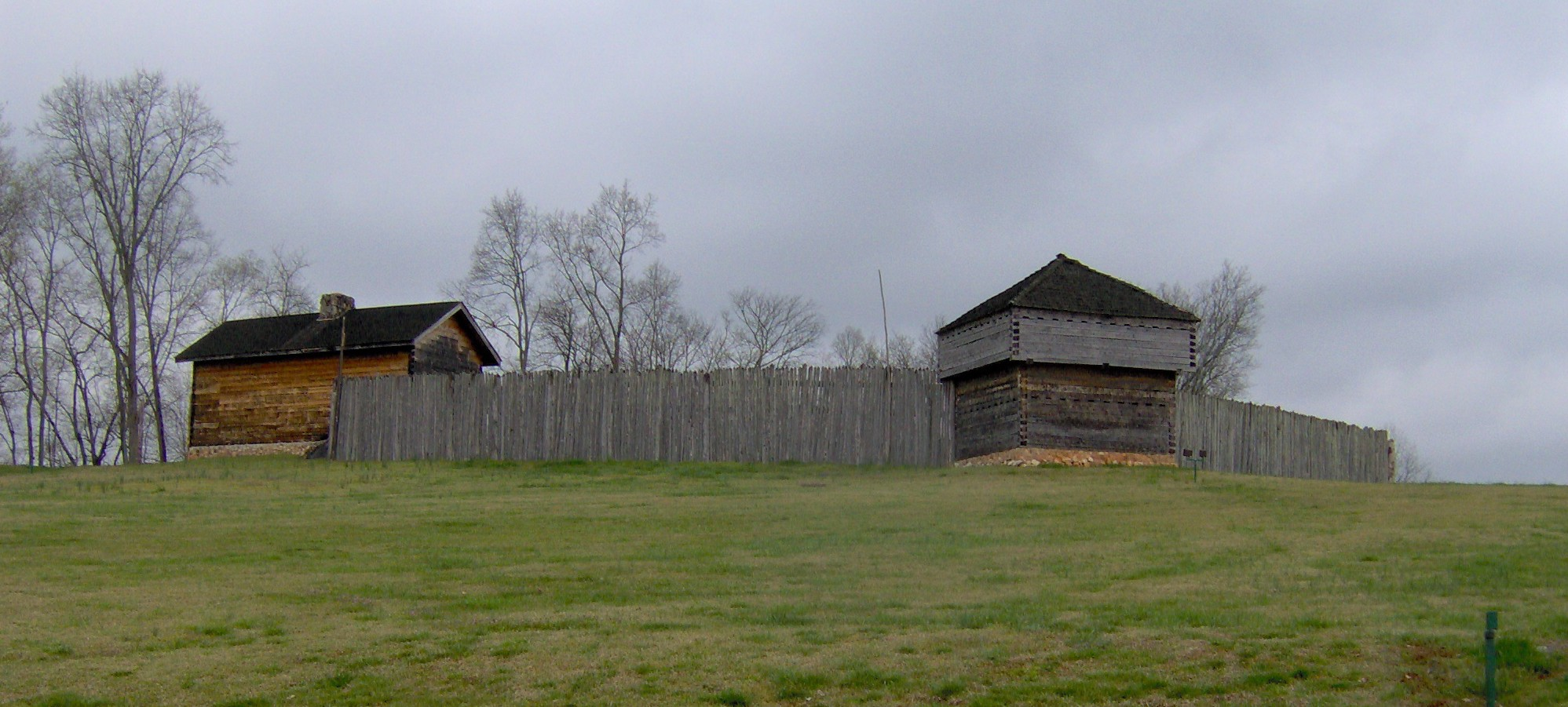
- Fort Southwest Point
- Location: Kingston, Tennessee
- Coordinates: 35.86056°N 84.52917°W
- Built: 1797
- NRHP reference No.: 72001252
- Added to NRHP: 1972

Fort Southwest Point was a federal frontier outpost at what is now Kingston, Tennessee, in the Southeastern United States. Constructed in 1797 and garrisoned by federal soldiers until 1811, the fort served as a major point of interaction between the Cherokee and the United States government as well as a way station for early migrants travelling between Knoxville and Nashville.

Although there are no records and few contemporary descriptions pertaining to the fort's design and structure, archaeological excavations conducted in the 1970s and 1980s have determined the fort's layout. Based on these findings, the City of Kingston and the Tennessee Division of Archaeology have reconstructed part of the fort. The site is managed by the City of Kingston.

In February 2024, Tennessee Governor Bill Lee announced that Fort Southwest Point will become a Tennessee State Park.

== Geographical setting ==
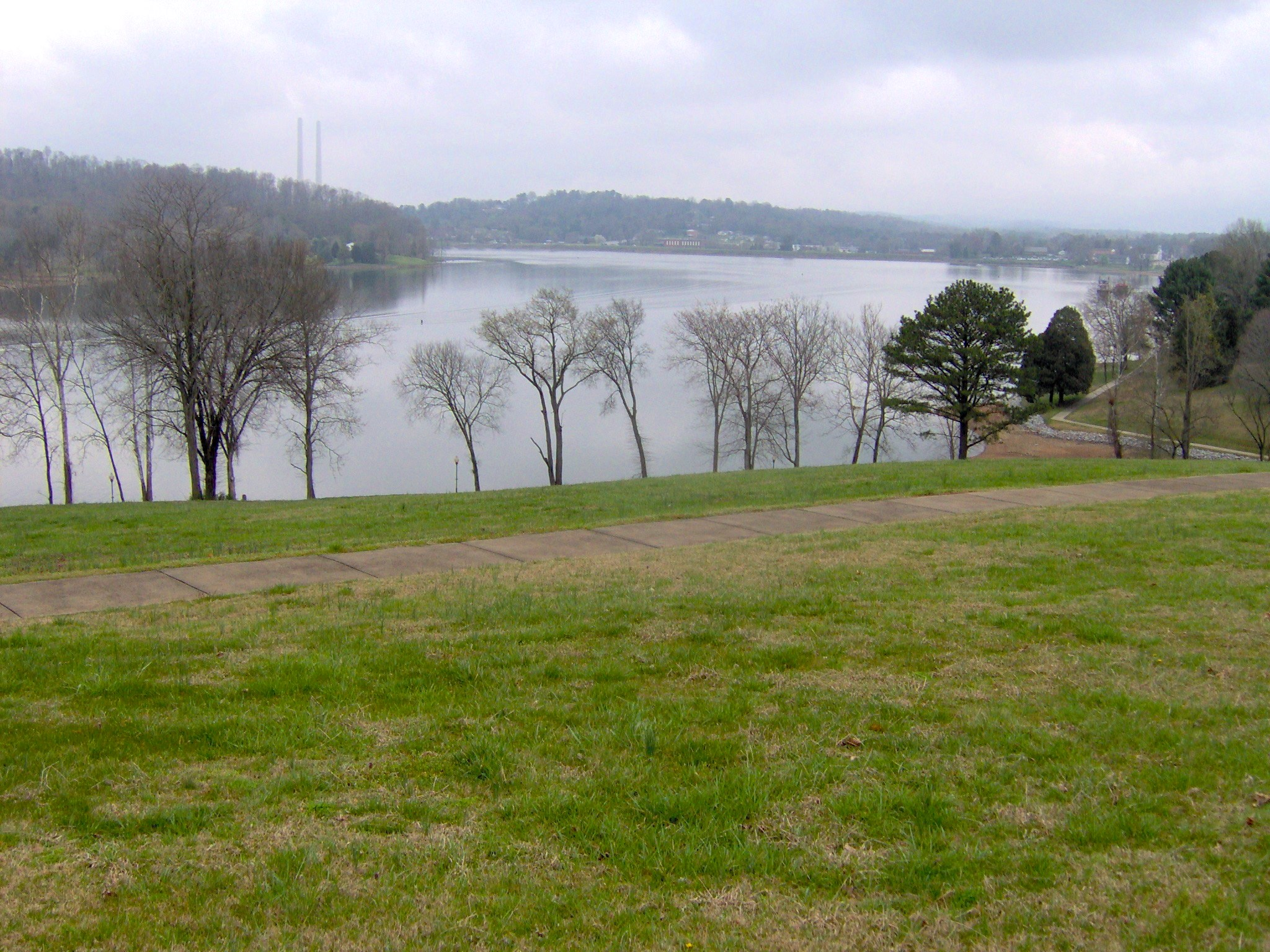
The Clinch River, viewed from the East Gate

The Fort Southwest Point site is situated on a hill overlooking the confluence of the Tennessee River and the Clinch River. This confluence is now part of the Watts Bar Lake impoundment of the Tennessee River, created by the completion of Watts Bar Dam in 1942. The Emory River empties into the Clinch approximately 5 miles (8.0 km) upstream from Southwest Point.

The Fort Southwest Point site is part of Southwest Point Park, which serves as both a historical and recreational area. The park is located along State Route 58 approximately 2 miles (3.2 km) south of Interstate 40 and 1 mile (1.6 km) south of U.S. Route 70.

== History ==
=== The Southwest Point Blockhouse, 1792-1797 ===
At the height of the American Revolution in 1779, Colonel Arthur Campbell suggested the confluence of the Clinch and Tennessee as a possible site for a fort to the governor of Virginia. Although Virginia never acted on Campbell's advice, the end of the war brought a flood of settlers into the Tennessee Valley, leading to increased conflict with the valley's Cherokee inhabitants. During this period, two events occurred that greatly enhanced Southwest Point's strategic importance: the construction of the Avery Trace in 1788 and the signing of the Treaty of Holston in 1791. The Avery Trace, which began at Southwest Point, became the key road connecting East Tennessee and Middle Tennessee until around 1800. The Treaty of Holston fixed the boundary between U.S. and Cherokee lands at the Clinch River, placing Southwest Point on the fringe of lands open to settlement in East Tennessee.

The waning years of the Cherokee–American wars brought an increase in Chickamauga Cherokee attacks against the encroaching Euro-American settlers. Territorial governor William Blount kept the militia on call for much of the early 1790s in order to protect settlers and enforce the terms of the Holston Treaty. John Sevier, who commanded part of the militia, encamped at Southwest Point in 1792. By November of that year, Sevier's troops had completed a blockhouse at the site, which they used as a base until 1793 when federal troops arrived.

=== Fort Southwest Point, 1797-1811 ===
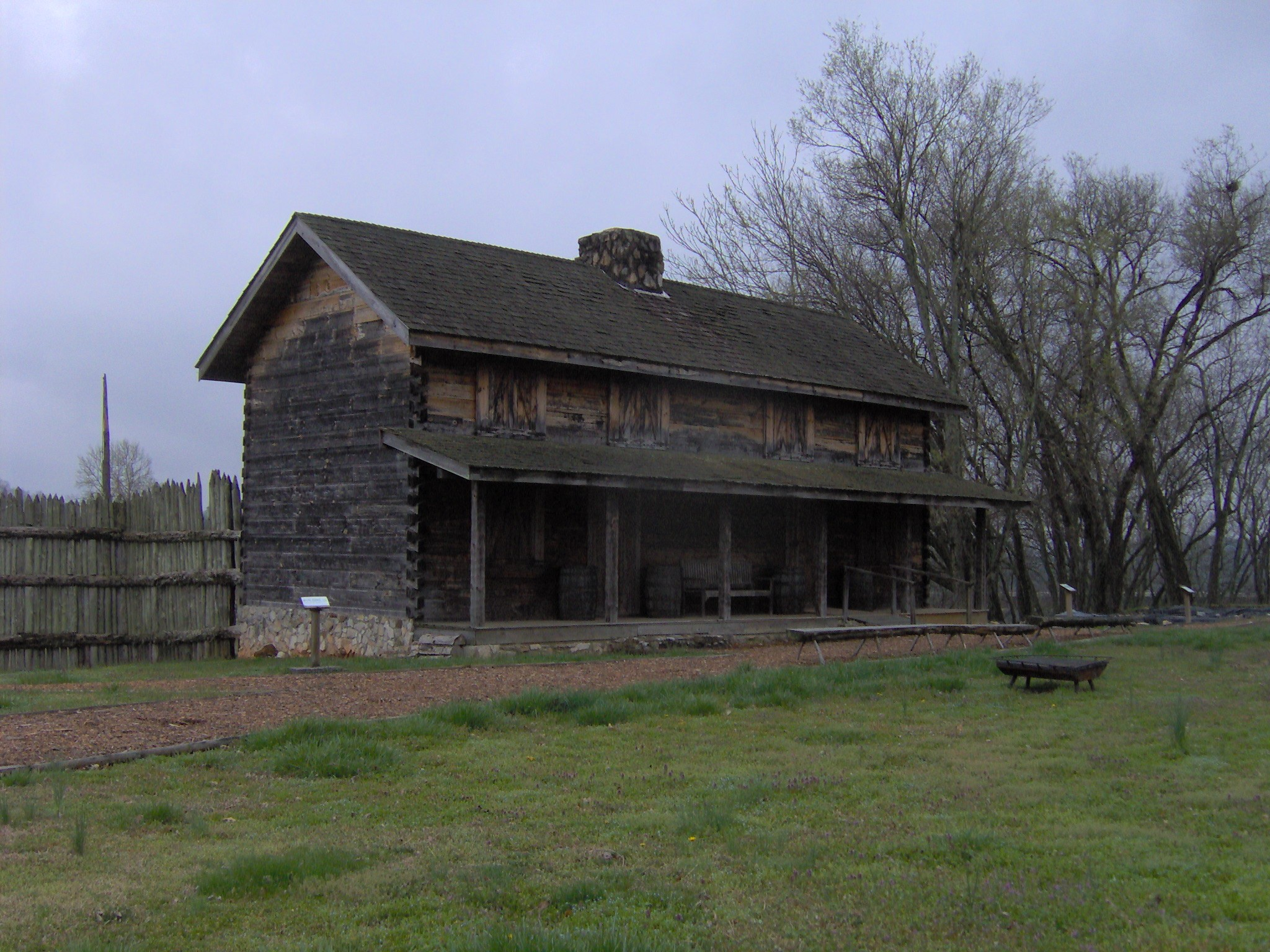
The main gatehouse

Between 1793 and 1796, the Southwest Point Blockhouse was garrisoned by a federal contingent of 10 to 15 troops. During this time, a decision was made to replace the blockhouse with a much larger fort. While the early records regarding the fort's construction were destroyed in a fire, historians have determined that the fort was completed by federal troops under the command of Captain John Wade and Captain Richard Sparks in July 1797. The fort was originally referred to as "Fort Butler" after Lieutenant-Colonel Thomas Butler (commander of federal forces in East Tennessee), but the name had been changed to "Fort Southwest Point" by 1798.

Lieutenant-Colonel Butler moved his headquarters to Fort Southwest Point in 1799, when nine companies (7 infantry, 1 artillery, and 1 dragoon) totaling roughly 400-500 troops were garrisoned at the fort. Around the same time, lots had been sold for what eventually became the city of Kingston, named for Major Robert King, an officer stationed at the fort.

Among the first duties of the Southwest Point garrison was to remove individuals (known as "squatters") who had settled on Cherokee lands illegally. However, the first Treaty of Tellico— which Butler helped negotiate in 1798— resolved many of the issues regarding squatters, and reduced the need for federal troops in the area. By 1801, the Southwest Point garrison consisted of roughly 100 troops.

In 1801, Colonel Return J. Meigs was appointed Cherokee Agent and Military Agent for the War Department in Tennessee. Although its garrison had been reduced, Fort Southwest Point served as an office for Meigs and as a distribution center for the Cherokee "annuity" (an annual payment of goods by the U.S. government in exchange for land cessions). Meigs immediately began negotiating with the Cherokee in hopes of obtaining permission to build a wagon road across their lands connecting Knoxville and Nashville. In 1805, the Third and Fourth Treaties of Tellico brought most of the Cumberland Plateau region under U.S. dominion, making the road possible. As the treaties pushed the U.S.-Cherokee border south to the Hiwassee River, the garrison at Southwest Point was no longer needed. By 1807, Meigs and most of the federal garrison had relocated to the Hiwassee area. A skeleton contingent of less than 5 soldiers maintained Fort Southwest Point until 1811.

== Archaeological findings ==
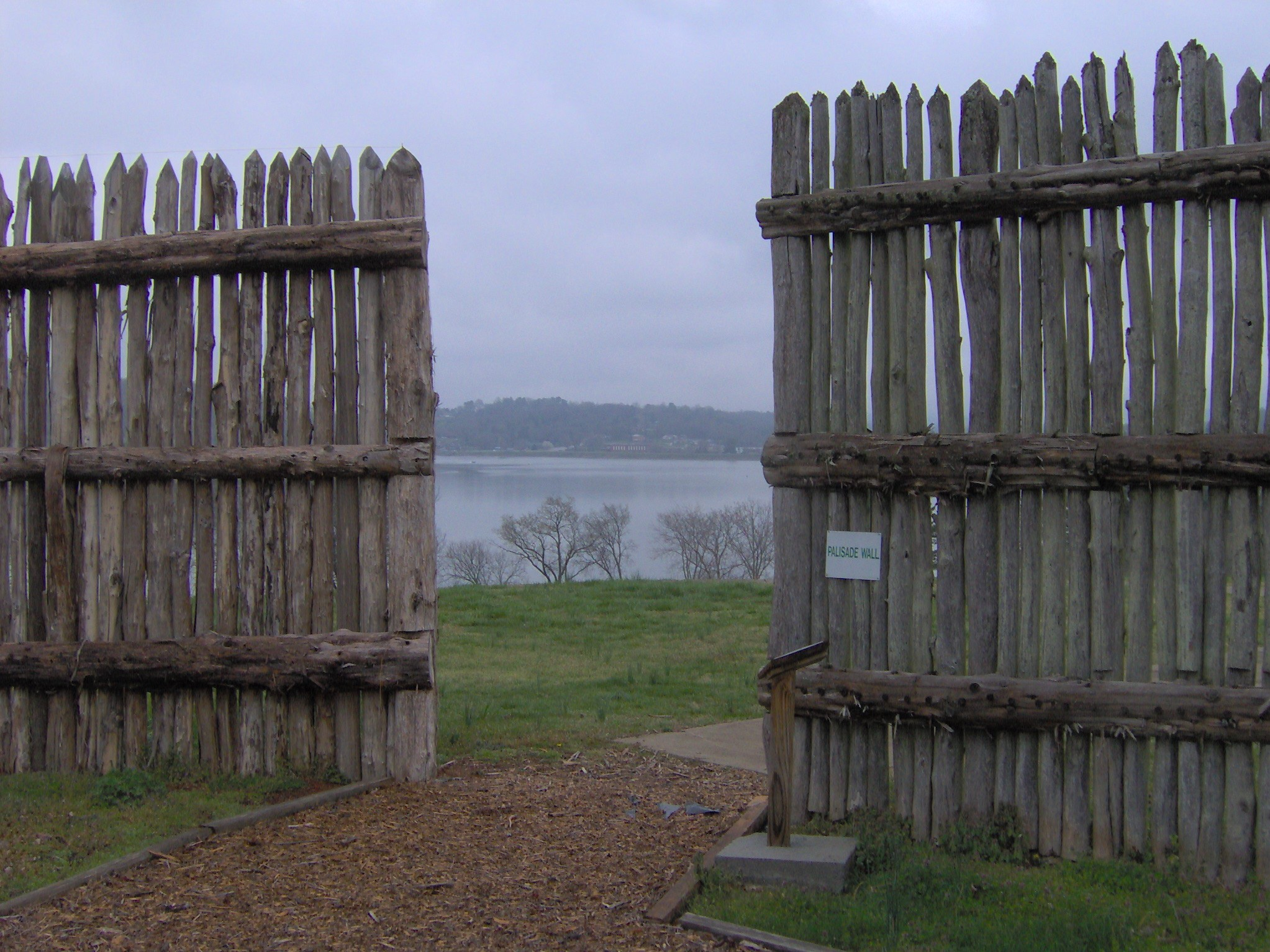
Palisade wall

The Southwest Point site was purchased by the Tennessee Valley Authority in the 1930s in anticipation of the construction of Watts Bar Dam (the site is well above reservoir flood levels, however). In 1973, the University of Tennessee conducted excavations at the site, locating six structures and evidence of prehistoric habitation. Between 1984 and 1986, the Tennessee Division of Archaeology, seeking information to aide in the fort's reconstruction, conducted more extensive investigations at the site. These excavations uncovered nine additional structures and the palisade ditch, allowing researchers to determine the fort's original layout.

The prehistoric findings at the site include an infant burial, storage pits, and sherds. Hickory nut shells uncovered in a basin-style hearth returned a radiocarbon date of approximately 1360 AD.

=== Structures ===
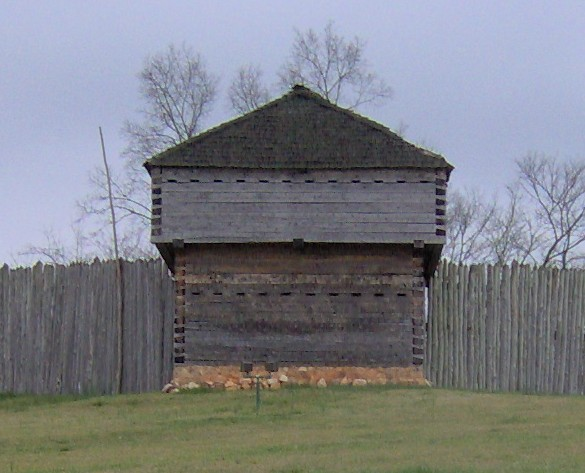
Southeast corner blockhouse (Structure 1)

According to archaeological findings, Fort Southwest Point was 297 feet (91 m) x 175 feet (53 m), enclosing approximately 1.2 acres (4,900 m^{2}). There were at least 15 structure located within the fort, the layout of which has been determined mostly from the remnants of their foundations.

- Structure 1 — 17 feet (5.2 m) x 22 feet (6.7 m), probably a corner blockhouse.
- Structure 2 — a vault, 14 feet (4.3 m) deep, probably a privy.
- Structure 3 — 70 feet (21 m) x 22 feet (6.7 m), probably officers' quarters and administrative offices.
- Structure 4 — 62 feet (19 m) x 22 feet (6.7 m), probably barracks. This structure included a drain that channeled water to a cistern.
- Structure 5 — 62 feet (19 m) x 22 feet (6.7 m), probably barracks.
- Structure 6 — 43.5 feet (13.3 m) x 22 feet (6.7 m), probably barracks.
- Structure 7 — appx. 83 feet (25 m) x 22 feet (6.7 m)
- Structure 8 — 43 feet (13 m) x 22 feet (6.7 m), possibly a distribution center.
- Structure 9 — a vault, 8 feet (2.4 m) x 10 feet (3.0 m) and 10.5 feet (3.2 m) deep, probably a privy.
- Structure 10 — 22 feet (6.7 m) x 18 feet (5.5 m), probably a corner blockhouse.
- Structure 11 — appx. 17 feet (5.2 m) x 18 feet (5.5 m), probably a blockhouse.
- Structure 12 — similar to Structures 2 and 9, probably a privy.
- Structure 13 — similar to Structures 10 and 11, probably a blockhouse.
- Structure 14 — 63 feet (19 m) x 17 feet (5.2 m), probably barracks.
- Structure 15 — 62 feet (19 m) x 23 feet (7.0 m), probably a supply building.

== See also ==
- Bledsoe's Station
- Fort Blount
- Tellico Blockhouse
