= John Broster =

American archaeologist

John B. Broster
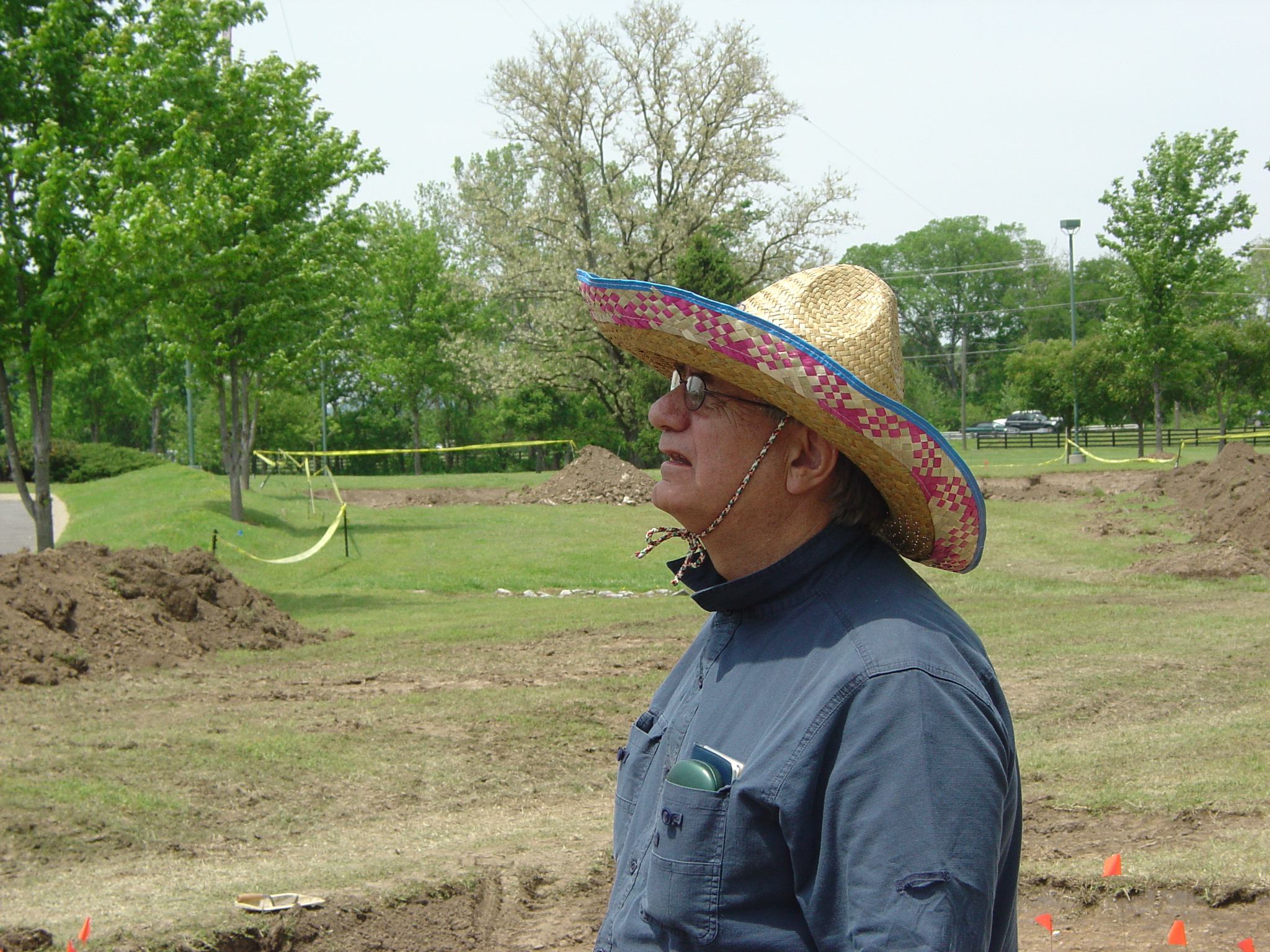
- Archaeologist John B. Broster on site in Williamson County, Tennessee (May 2008)
- Born: May 17, 1945; Tallahassee, Florida, U.S.
- Education: Vanderbilt University; University of New Mexico
- Known for: Archaeology in Tennessee, Paleoindian studies
- Scientific career
- Fields: Archaeologist

John Bertram Broster (born 17 May 1945) is an American archaeologist formerly serving as the Prehistoric Archeological Supervisor at the Tennessee Division of Archaeology, Department of Environment and Conservation. He is best known for his work on the Paleoindian period of the American Southwest and Southeast, and has published some 38 book chapters and journal articles on the subject.

== Background ==
John Broster was born in 1945, in Tallahassee, Florida. Broster currently lives in the Nashville, Tennessee area with his wife, Diane Gusky. John and Diane have been married for over 30 years. John has had an interest in archaeology all his life, and for this reason Broster has been quoted saying, "My work is my hobby".

== Academic career ==
Broster began his undergraduate career in Tennessee and attended the George Peabody College of Education and Human Development at Vanderbilt University. He attended the school from 1965 to 1968, and received his B.A. in sociology-anthropology in 1968.

Upon completion of his undergraduate degree in the spring of 1968, John enrolled as a graduate student at the University of New Mexico and started there in the fall of 1968. Focusing on paleoindian studies, John spent several years in New Mexico alongside his friend and colleague, Dennis Stanford and completed his master's degree in 1971.

John continued his studies at the University of New Mexico until 1973, when he began working for the Tennessee Division of Archaeology.

== Archaeological career ==
During his undergraduate career, Broster attended several field projects in the Mixteca Alta in the State of Oaxaca, Mexico, which is a site dedicated to understanding Mixteca origins. The field seasons of 1966 and 1967 that John attended consisted of survey work, and he returned two years later in 1970 to participate in excavations.

Later on, after completing his M.A. at New Mexico, Lewis Binford had arranged for Broster and other graduate students to attend a field season with Robert Whallon at a Mesolithic site in the Netherlands in 1973.

In the summer of 1973, Broster took a job with his colleague; Dennis Stanford-who was then working at the Smithsonian Institution. Under Stanford, Broster was involved with the first field season at the Jones-Miller Bison Kill Site in northeast Colorado and participated in some of the first excavations at the site.

After the Jones-Miller project ended in the summer of 1973, the newly established Tennessee Division of Archaeology, Department of Environment and Conservation hired Broster as the regional archaeologist for Western Tennessee. John worked for the Tennessee Division of Archaeology from 1973 to 1975.

In 1975, Broster left the Tennessee Division of Archaeology and took a job as the project director at the Office of Contract Archaeology (OCA) at the University of New Mexico in 1976–1977. He oversaw numerous excavations and published in several journals at the school.

In 1977, Broster left the OCA and was hired by the Bureau of Indian Affairs (BIA) Forestry Department as the field director in 1978. Broster was later promoted to the archaeological program director, where he oversaw a series of surveys on a multitude of Native American reservations. Some of these surveys included work at the, Jicarilla and Mescalero Apache reservations, and Acoma and Isleta Pueblo reservations. While working for the BIA, John Broster was awarded two consecutive Achievement Awards for his outstanding work as the archaeological program director in 1983 and 1984. Broster worked with the BIA until early 1984.

In the latter half of 1984 until early 1985, Broster worked for and helped operate the Cultural Resources Management Company, "San Juan Basin Archeological Consultants", with Stephen Lentz, Bradley Vierra and John Ackland. In 1985, Broster was re-hired by the Tennessee Division of Archaeology, where he remains to this day.

== Division of Archaeology career ==
Broster served as the Middle Tennessee regional archaeologist for the Tennessee Division of Archaeology and was the prehistoric archaeological supervisor for many years, until his retirement in 2013. It was Broster's job, and the responsibility of the division to survey, excavate, and preserve prehistoric and historic sites in Tennessee, as well as research and publish on their findings in popular and scientific formats. Most importantly, it is the goal of the division to maintain public interest in Archaeology in order to encourage public cooperation with site preservation.

Broster and his colleagues have practiced a "systematic approach" to recording Paleoindian projectile points at each site they've worked on since the late 1980s. At sites like the Carson-Conn-Short site and the Johnson site, where there are thousands of artifacts, a systematic approach helps to add information to the bigger picture of southeastern archaeology. Broster and his colleagues have contributed a great deal of information to the University of Tennessee's Paleoindian Database of the Americas (PIDBA).

== Key sites and excavations ==
During his time with the Tennessee Division of Archaeology, John Broster and his co-workers at the Tennessee Division of Archaeology have conducted fieldwork at many important sites critical to the understanding of Tennessee Prehistory and Paleoindian research in the Southeast.

Some of these key sites and excavations include...

- The Carson-Conn-Short Site (40BM190)
- The Johnson Site (40DV400)
- The Johnson-Hawkins Site (40DV313)
- The Sinclair Site (40WY11)
- The Puckett Site (40SW228)
- The Widemeier Site (40DV09)
- The Coats-Hines Site (40WM31)

Broster and his colleagues have been heavily involved in archaeological research along the Cumberland River and in the Kentucky Lake Region of Tennessee.Sites examined by Broster in these areas include, the Johnson (40DV400) and the Carson-Conn-Short (40BN190) sites, which according to Broster are "probably two of the most important Clovis sites in the history of southeastern Paleoindian studies". In addition, both of these sites seem to support a southern beginning for the fluted clovis point tradition, in that they seem to resemble the tool kit used in the western United States.

The artifact concentration of the Carson-Conn-Short site and the Johnson site (40DV400) indicate that these sites may have been Paleoindian base camps, where the knapping of projectile points and other daily activities of hunter-gatherers took place. Over 40 hearths were unearthed at the Carson-Conn-Short site, and many were found at the Johnson site as well. These hearths evidence the possibility of base camps proposed by Broster and Norton.

At the Johnson site, occupations were preliminarily dated to around 11,700-11,980 B.P. based on radiocarbon samples from Stratum III/IV processed by the University of Texas radiocarbon lab. The standard deviations for these early dates from Johnson are significant, in two cases exceeding 900 years. Other diagnostic artifacts and dated material from features in Stratum III at the Johnson site returned radiocarbon dates of 8000-9000 B.P., suggesting that the early dates from Johnson may be in error.

Both the Johnson and Carson-Conn-Short sites proved essential in furthering the study of Paleoindian history of the southeast, and dating of these sites is critical in understanding the origins of Clovis culture, and how and when it spread across the United States. Broster once said that Carson-Conn-Short (40BN190) had been the most rewarding site he has ever worked on. It is thanks in part to Broster and his colleagues that we now know Tennessee was a major focus of Paleoindian settlement.

== Research and selected publications ==
Though the majority of John Broster's archeological career has been based more or less in government office rather than in strict academia, he has produced some 50 publications over the last 40 years. Of these, 38 have been focused on Paleoindian research.

Book Chapters

•Broster, John B., and Norton, Mark R. 1992. Paleoindian Projectile Point and Site Survey in Tennessee: 1988–1992. In Paleoindian and Early Archaic Period Research in the Lower Southeast: A South Carolina Perspective, edited by D. G. Anderson, K. E. Sassaman, and C. Judge, pp. 263–68. Council of South Carolina Professional Archaeologists, Columbia.

•Broster, J. B., M. R. Norton, D. J. Stanford, C. V. Haynes Jr., and M. A. Jodry 1996. Stratified Fluted Point Deposits in the Western Valley of Tennessee. In Proceedings of the 14th Annual Mid-South Archaeological Conference, edited by Richard Walling, Camille Wharey, and Camille Stanley, pp. 1–11. Panamerican Consultants, Special Publications 1. Tuscaloosa, Alabama.

•Broster, John B., and Norton, Mark R. 1996. Recent Paleoindian Research in Tennessee. In The Paleoindian and Early Archaic Southeast, edited by D. G. Anderson and K. E. Sassaman, pp. 288–297. University of Alabama Press, Tuscaloosa.

Journal Articles

-Current Research in the Pleistocene-

•Broster, John B. 1989. A Preliminary Survey of Paleo-Indian Sites in Tennessee. Current Research in the Pleistocene 6:29-31.

•Broster, John B., M. R. Norton, and Richard Anderson 1991. Clovis and Cumberland Sites in the Kentucky Lake Region. Current Research in the Pleistocene 8:10–12.

•Broster, J. B., D. P. Johnson, and M. R. Norton 1991. The Johnson Site: A Dated Clovis-Cumberland Occupation in Tennessee. Current Research in the Pleistocene 8:8–10.

•Broster, John B. and Mark R. Norton 1993. The Carson-Conn-Short Site (40BN190): An Extensive Clovis Habitation in Benton County, Tennessee. Current Research in the Pleistocene 10:3-5.

•Broster, J. B., M. R. Norton, D. J. Stanford, C. V. Haynes Jr., and M. A. Jodry. 1994. Eastern Clovis Adaptations in the Tennessee River Valley. Current Research in the Pleistocene 11:12–14.

•Breitburg, Emmanuel, and John B. Broster. 1994. Paleoindian Site, Lithic, and Mastodon Distributions in Tennessee. Current Research in the Pleistocene 11:9-11.

•Breitburg, E., J.B. Broster, A.L. Reesman, and R.G. Stearns. 1996. The Coats-Hines Site: Tennessee's First Paleoindian-Mastodon Association. Current Research in the Pleistocene 13:6-8.

•Norton, Mark R., John B. Broster, and Emanuel Breitburg. 1998. The Trull Site (40PY276). Current Research in the Pleistocene 15:50-51.

•Norton, Mark R., and John B. Broster 2006. Clovis Blade Manufacture: Preliminary Data from the Carson-Conn-Short Site (40BN190), Tennessee. Current Research in the Pleistocene 23:145-147

-Tennessee Anthropologist-

•Broster, John B. 1982. Paleo-Indian Habitation at the Pierce Site (40Cs24); Chester County, Tennessee. Tennessee Anthropologist 7:93–104.

•Broster, J. B., and M. R. Norton. 1990. Lithic Analysis and Paleo-Indian Utilization of the Twelkemeier Site (40HS173). Tennessee Anthropologist 15:115–131.

•Norton, Mark R. and John B. Broster. 1992. 40HS200: The Nuckolls Extension Site. Tennessee Anthropologist 17:13-32.

•Broster, John B., and Gary L. Barker. 1992. Second Report of Investigations at the Johnson Site (40Dv400): The 1991 Field Season. Tennessee Anthropologist 17(2):120-130.
