= Tennessee Division of Archaeology =

- TDOA

Agency overview
- Formed: 1972
- Jurisdiction: State of Tennessee
- Headquarters: Nashville, Tennessee
- Agency executive: State Archaeologist, Michael C. Moore
- Parent agency: Tennessee Department of Environment and Conservation
- Website: www.tn.gov/environment/program-areas/arch-archaeology.html

The Tennessee Division of Archaeology (TDOA) is a division of the Tennessee Department of Environment and Conservation responsible for managing prehistoric archaeological sites on lands owned by the U.S. state of Tennessee, conducting archaeological excavations and research, informing the public about Tennessee’s prehistoric past, and coordinating with other state agencies regarding archaeological preservation issues.

The TDOA has two main divisions. The Technical Assistance Group is responsible for the protection of archaeological sites and artifacts on all lands owned or controlled by the state. This group also provides technical assistance for state agencies (including State Parks), law enforcement, municipalities, development communities, and the general public. Assistance is offered to public and private entities on legal and technical aspects of prehistoric Native American cemetery relocation and related concerns. This group also conducts research and publishes reports on archaeological subjects, some of which are available for free download via the Division of Archaeology website. The Site File and Review Group maintains accurate records on all known archaeological sites in the state, and coordinates with state agencies to assess impacts of proposed activities on known or suspected sites. This group also provides expertise to the State Historic Preservation Office by reviewing all federally funded projects within Tennessee to determine their impact on archaeological resources. The TDOA presently employs eight archaeologists, a site files coordinator, and an administrative secretary at the Nashville location. An auxiliary storage facility is located at Pinson Mounds State Park near Jackson, Tennessee.

Each January, the TDOA, in conjunction with the Middle Tennessee State University Department of Sociology and Anthropology, co-sponsors the Current Research in Tennessee Archaeology meeting. The meeting is open to the public and features presentations by both professional and avocational archaeologists.

== History of the TDOA ==
Prior to the creation of the Tennessee Division of Archaeology (TDOA) in 1970, there had been State Archaeologists, but no state organization that was tasked with watching over Tennessee's archaeology sites. The first official State Archaeologist was Parmenio E. Cox, who was appointed to the role by Governor Austin Peay in 1924 after the death of William Edward Myer, who had served as the unofficial state archaeologist. Cox held the role until he died in 1932.

The TDOA was established in 1970 under the Department of Conservation through the "Tennessee Antiquities Act" (TCA 11-6-101-121), and the first staff members were hired in 1972, with Mack S. Prichard being appointed to the role of State Archaeologist in 1971. The TDOA had a very small budget when it was first created, which only allowed for the hiring of an assistant, which was Patti Coats. Prichard was able to secure additional funds and then hired three regional archaeologists and a Historical Archaeologist in 1972. These included Brian Butler (who oversaw the eastern part of the state,) John Broster (who oversaw the west), Carl Kuttruff (who oversaw Middle Tennessee), and Joe Benthall (who served as the first Historical Archaeologist).

Benthall became the state archaeologist after Mack Prichard retired in 1973 and Sam Smith was then hired to take over as the Historical Archaeologist. Patti Coats was also moved into the new position of Site Files Curator during this time. The Division experienced some structural changes during the late 1970s, which merged them with the TN State Parks Department. The position of State Archaeologist was eliminated at this time and Joseph Benthall was moved to a regional archaeologist position. Historical Archaeologist Sam Smith served as the acting State Archaeologist during this period. This merger was short-lived, however, with the TDOA again becoming its own Division in 1983 with the appointment of a new State Archaeologist, Nick Fielder, by Commissioner Charles A. Howell. Fielder had been serving as the first State Historic Preservation Office Archaeologist since 1976. He served as State Archaeologist until 2007, when he retired. Mike Moore then became the State Archaeologist in 2007. After Moore's retirement in 2020, the position was taken over by the current State Archaeologist, Phil Hodge. In 1991, the Department of Conservation merged with the Environment side of the former Department of Health and Environment to become the Department of Environment and Conservation (TDEC). The TDOA is still a Division of TDEC.

State-wide field projects have comprised an important Division mandate since the beginning. Significant investigations on state-owned properties include Mound Bottom, Sellars Farm, Pinson Mounds, Fort Loudoun, Ft. Pillow, Riverbend Prison, SR-42 (Algood), Hiwassee Old Town, Sandbar Village, Carter House (Williamson County), Spencer Youth Center, Special Needs Prison, Middle TN Veterans Cemetery, Bicentennial Mall, and Ropers Knob. Select site investigations on non-state lands include Brick Church Pike Mound, Fort Southwest Point, First Hermitage, Yearwood, Penitentiary Branch, Fort Blount, Brandywine Pointe, Coats-Hines Mastodon, Johnson, Old Town, Gordontown, Austin Cave, Carson-Conn-Short, Rutherford-Kizer, Brentwood Library, Moss-Wright and collaborative investigations along the Cumberland River near Nashville following the 2010 floods. Thematic historic site surveys (such as potteries, gunmaking, Highland Rim iron industry, Civil War, World War II, Rosenwald Schools, and Trail of Tears) have also been an important component of TDOA research. Reconnaissance surveys for prehistoric sites have been conducted within the Obion, Duck, Cumberland, Harpeth, Caney Fork, Collins, Calfkiller, and Hiwassee/Ocoee River watersheds.

The Division’s ability to perform larger-scale site excavations has significantly diminished over the years due to the same position reductions experienced by other state agencies. Division positions have been cut roughly 70% over the past 25 years, from about 35 positions during the mid-1980s to the current 10 positions. Most of the eliminated positions were part-time/seasonal posts used to employ project field crews. As a result, the TDOA now focuses on smaller-scale survey and site investigations, and also responds to emergency situations as possible.

== See also ==
- List of archaeological sites in Tennessee
