= Paul Broster =

Australian cricketer (born 1973)

Personal information
- Born: 31 January 1973 (age 53); Wangaratta, Australia

Domestic team information
- Years: Team
- 1995-1996: Victoria
- Source: Cricinfo, 12 December 2015

Paul Broster (born 31 January 1973) is an Australian former cricketer. He played two first-class cricket matches for Victoria between 1995 and 1996.

== See also ==
- List of Victoria first-class cricketers
