= Coats–Hines site =

Paleontological site in Tennessee, US

Coordinates: 35°57′38″N 86°47′41″W

The Coats–Hines–Litchy site (formerly Coats–Hines) is a paleontological site located in Williamson County, Tennessee, in the Southeastern United States. The site was formerly believed to be archaeological, and identified as one of only a very few locations in Eastern North America containing evidence of Paleoindian hunting of late Pleistocene proboscideans. Excavations at the site have yielded portions of four mastodon skeletons, including portions of one previously described as being in direct association with Paleoindian stone tools. The results of excavations have been published in Tennessee Conservationist, and the scholarly journals Current Research in the Pleistocene, Tennessee Archaeology, and Quaternary Science Reviews. The site was listed on the National Register of Historic Places on July 12, 2011.

== Site summary ==
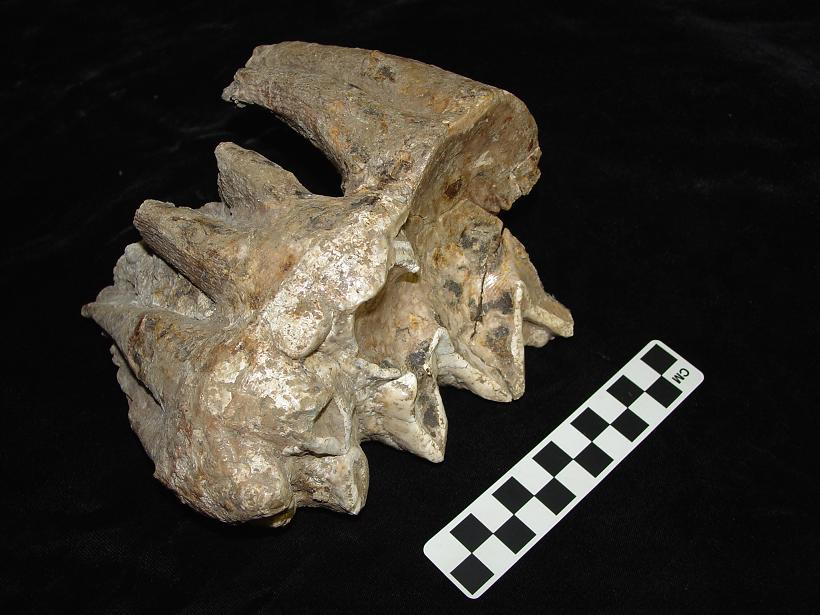
Molar from mastodon A at the Coats–Hines site

The Coats–Hines–Litchy site is located east of I-65 near CoolSprings Galleria in Williamson County, Tennessee. The site was initially recorded in 1977 when several large bones were identified during landscaping at the Crockett Springs Golf Course (now the Nashville Golf and Athletic Club). Salvage work by staff from the Tennessee Division of Archaeology recovered the partial skeleton of a single mature female mastodon (“mastodon A”) from along a small stream drainage. No description of this excavation or the skeletal material was ever published, and the area that contained the remains was subsequently destroyed by earthmoving along the 13th hole of the golf course. In 1994, construction of a subdivision just west of the golf course by the company Hines Interest LP resulted in identification of a well-preserved bone bed of Pleistocene-aged faunal material. The bone bed was situated 20 metres (65 feet 7 1/2 inches) west of the original mastodon find along a deeply incised portion of the same stream channel, approximately 2 metres (6 feet 6 1/2 inches) below ground surface. Salvage excavations resulted in the identification of several late ice age species, including horse, deer, muskrat, and the partial, disarticulated remains of a young male mastodon (“mastodon B”) The remains of a third mastodon (“mastodon C”) were identified eroding from the bank line approximately 50 m west of mastodon B, but were not excavated. The site, owned at the time of the 1994 excavation by Gary T. Baker, was assigned state number 40WM31, and named “Coats–Hines” in honor of Tennessee Division of Archaeology staff member Patricia Coats, who participated in the excavation of mastodon A, and the Hines corporation, which facilitated the 1994 salvage work. The site name was expanded to add "Litchy" in 2012 in honor of the landowner. Following excavations, the area that contained mastodon B was backfilled and incorporated into the backyard of a single-family home.

Although Tennessee Division of Archaeology staff continued to monitor the stream drainage, no additional excavations took place at the site until 2008. That year, limited excavations were performed to recover several heavily fragmented bones eroding from the bank line at the location of mastodon C. Poor preservation of the material prevented conclusive identification of the animal’s species, sex, or age. Additional site inspections of the stream channel that same year resulted in the recovery of a bifacial stone tool and a highly mineralized fragment of deer antler. Both items had eroded from their original context and could not conclusively be associated with the Pleistocene bone bed. However, staff from the Gray Fossil Site & Museum concluded the antler fragment exhibited an extreme level of mineralization, suggesting at least a late Pleistocene origin. This find is noteworthy in that Pleistocene deer have only been recorded at 12 other sites in Tennessee.

In 2010, archaeologists from the Tennessee Division of Archaeology were awarded a Historic Preservation Grant through the Tennessee Historical Commission and National Park Service to conduct additional archaeological testing at the Coats–Hines site in order to assess its archaeological integrity and eligibility for inclusion in the National Register of Historic Places. A total of 1,582 faunal remains, including both whole and fragmentary elements from turtle, rodent, deer, large Pleistocene vertebrate, small amounts of ivory, and a possible fragment of Mastodon tooth were recovered during the 2010 investigations. Additionally, the test excavations recovered 12 stone flake fragments, potentially resulting from stone tool manufacture. Two broken prismatic blades were recovered out of context and cannot be directly associated with the bone bed. Based on the presence and significance of intact archaeological or paleontological deposits, the site was nominated eligible for the National Register of Historic Places under Criterion D of 36 CFR 60.4. This site was listed on the National Register on July 12, 2011.

The site was once again studied in 2012 through extensive excavation by a team from the Center for the Study of the First Americans at Texas A&M University. As part of that effort the team conducted reexaminations of all existing site materials and data, including a reanalysis of all stone and bone artifacts identified to date and their provenience within the site. The results of that examination ultimately concluded that the Coats–Hines site represents a non-anthropogenic deposit of Pleistocene fauna within a fluvial environment.

== Paleoindian–Mastodon association ==
During the 1994 excavations of mastodon B, archaeologists identified 34 lithic items identified as stone tools or debitage, apparently in association with the disarticulated faunal remains. These tools included prismatic blades, scrapers, gravers, and resharpening flakes. Subsequent examination of the bones from mastodon B revealed what were identified as cut marks on a thoracic vertebra, which was recovered in direct contact with several flakes. Based on the profile and character of these marks, and their location along the thoracic spinous process, it was proposed that they resulted from butchering, and specifically, efforts to remove dorsal muscles along the backbone. Radiocarbon and Oxidizable carbon ratio samples collected in 1984 from sediments surrounding the remains of mastodon B returned dates ranging in age between 10,260+/-240 and 14,750+/-220 radiocarbon years before present (14C BP), with a maximum age of 27,050+/-200 14C BP. Radiocarbon samples from around the bone deposits collected in 2010 returned dates of 1960+/-30, 12,300+/-60, 23,250+/-110, and 29,120+/-110 14C BP. Collectively these dates suggested a possible pre-Clovis affiliation for the site, but included problematic maximum and minimum age ranges.

Subsequent reexaminations of lithic materials from the site by Tune et al. revealed that all flake fragments recovered from within the bone bed lacked distinctive physical traits which would conclusively demonstrate that they resulted from human manufacture rather than natural processes. An assessment of the original excavation data showed that all formal stone tools previously identified from the site were either 1) not actually tools; or 2) recovered out of context from areas of secondary deposition, and so cannot be associated with the mastodon remains. Examinations of the proposed gravers showed them to be fortuitously shaped natural objects, or geofacts, without any evidence of intentional flaking or usewear. A possible bone spear point recovered from within the bone bed in 1995 was determined to instead be a naturally-splintered bone fragment with three flat, angular sides and no unequivocal evidence of intentional modification. Comprehensive radiocarbon dating of the site revealed that bone-bearing sediments were situated within strata deposited between approximately 22,490+/-100 and 36,590+/-650 14C BP. This range significantly predates the accepted period of initial human occupation in Tennessee or the American southeast. No contemporary examination or assessment of the proposed cut marks on the mastodon B remains has been undertaken to date.

Geoarchaeological analysis of soils from the 1994 excavations suggested that at the end of the Pleistocene epoch, the area which includes mastodons A, B, and C was situated along the margins of a shallow pond. In the initial site analysis, Breitburg et al. suggest this pond formed as a result of a beaver dam or other natural blockage along the stream channel. Numerous animals, including mastodons, would have congregated at this pond. Detailed geoarchaeological analysis in 2012 demonstrated there is no occupation surface present at the site, and indicated that the bone bed was formed within an active fluvial setting.

== See also ==
- List of archaeological sites in Tennessee
- History of Tennessee
- Tennessee Division of Archaeology
